= Sumdo, Himachal Pradesh =

Sumdo
- Village
- Interactive map of Sumdo
- Location in Himachal Pradesh Sumdo (India)
- Coordinates: 32.0525°N 78.6062°E
- Country: India
- State: Himachal Pradesh
- District: Lahul and Spiti
- Tehsil: Spiti

Area
  - Total: 221.92 km^{2} (85.68 sq mi)
- Elevation: 3,090 m (10,140 ft)

Population (2011)
  - Total: 598
- Time zone: UTC+5:30 (IST)

Sumdo is a village in the Lahul and Spiti district, in Himachal Pradesh, India. It is at the confluence of the Pare Chu river with the Spiti River. Sumdo is close to the border with Tibet, the opposite side on the Tibetan side being the Tsosib Sumkyil Township (Churup Sumkhel). China claims the village as part of its Tsamda County, Tibet.

== Geography ==
Sumdo lies in the Zanskar Range on the bank of the Spiti River near its confluence with the Pare Chu river (or Parang River). Pare Chu originates in Spiti and takes a circuitous route through Ladakh and Tibet's Tsamda County, finally reentering Spiti at Kaurik, 20 east of Sumdo. It joins the Spiti River at Sumdo, the combined river being called "Li River".

Across the border at Kaurik is the village of Churup (Tsurup), the seat of the Tsosib Sumkyil Township in Tsamda County of the Tibet region of China.

== Sino-Indian border dispute ==
In 1847, when the British border commission headed by Alexander Cunningham went to the Indo-Tibetan border, they were unobustructed till reaching Kaurik, but were prohibited from going beyond. They sent a letter to the governor of Gartok, and followed a circuitous route through Spiti to enter Ladakh. (Spiti was traditionally part of Ladakh, but it had been recently annexed by British India.)

In December 1957, seven years after the Chinese annexation of Tibet, Chinese forces are said to have intruded at Kaurik, for which India lodged a protest. In 1959, after the Kongka La incident, China raised a number of disputes regarding the border, including one at Kaurik. However, there have been no clashes at this location till date.

During the 1990s, a joint working group of India and China held multiple meetings and exchanged maps of the "middle sector" of the border in 2000. The Kaurik area, including Gue and Sumdo, was identified as one of the locations where the claims of the two countries overlapped, and the disputed territory was estimated to be 250 square kilometres (97 sq mi).

== Transportation ==
Sumdo is served by two national highways—NH 5 (Sumdo-Nako-Shimla Highway) through Kinnaur district and NH 505 (Sumdo-Kaza-Gramphu-Manali highway) through the Spiti River valley. The latter remains closed for 7 months due to winter snows on the Kunzum Pass (4,551 m or 14,931 ft). A dual-use airstrip, 100 km to the west, is under construction, scheduled to be completed in 2024.

== See also ==
- Indo-China Border Roads
- India–China border infrastructure
