= Gue, Himachal Pradesh =

Village in Lahul and Spiti District, Himachal Pradesh, India

Gue Gipu
- Village
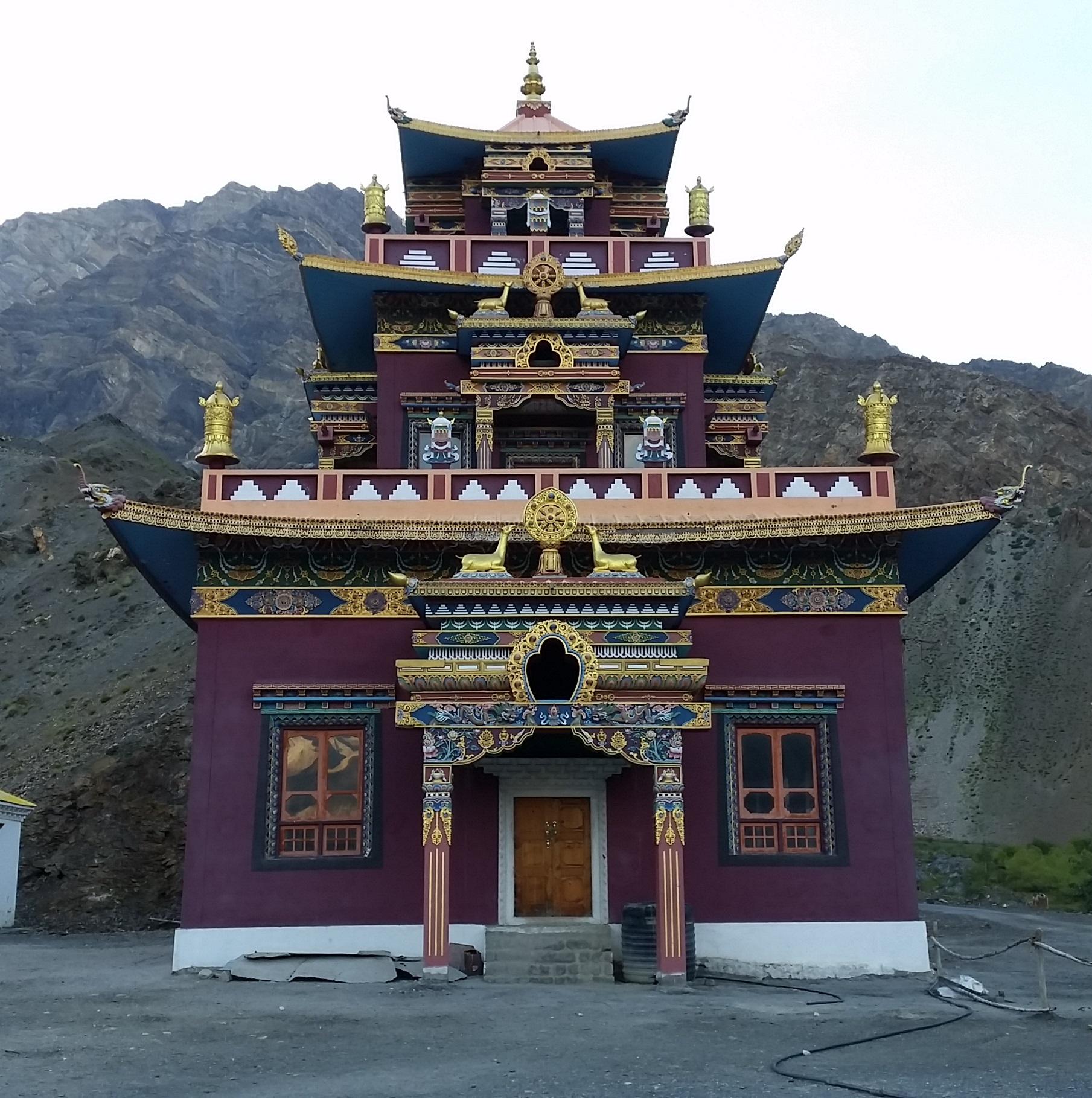
- Gue Monastery
- Interactive map of Gue
- Location in Himachal Pradesh Gue (India)
- Coordinates: 32.1311°N 78.5697°E
- Country: India
- State: Himachal Pradesh
- District: Lahul and Spiti
- Tehsil: Spiti

Area
  - Total: 185.16 km^{2} (71.49 sq mi)
- Elevation: 3,620 m (11,880 ft)

Population (2011)
  - Total: 223
  - Density: 1.20/km^{2} (3.12/sq mi)
- Time zone: UTC+5:30 (IST)

Gue or Gyu (Note: The Chinese spelling is Chinese: 巨哇; pinyin: Jù wa. It was transliterated as "Chuva" in 1960.) is a village in the Lahul and Spiti district of the state of Himachal Pradesh in India. It is claimed by China as part of Tsamda County in Ngari Prefecture in Tibet. The village is about 40 km from the Tabo Monastery, at latitude 31.11 and longitude 77.16. The village is 10,000 feet above sea level and 500 km away from the state capital, between the towns of Sumdo and Tabo.

== Geography ==
Gue is close to the India-China border, in the valley of the Gue stream, which joins the Spiti River roughly 10 km downstream near the Sumdo village.

== Demographics ==
Per the 2011 census, Gue has a population of 223 people, 132 male and 91 female.

== Buddhist monastery ==
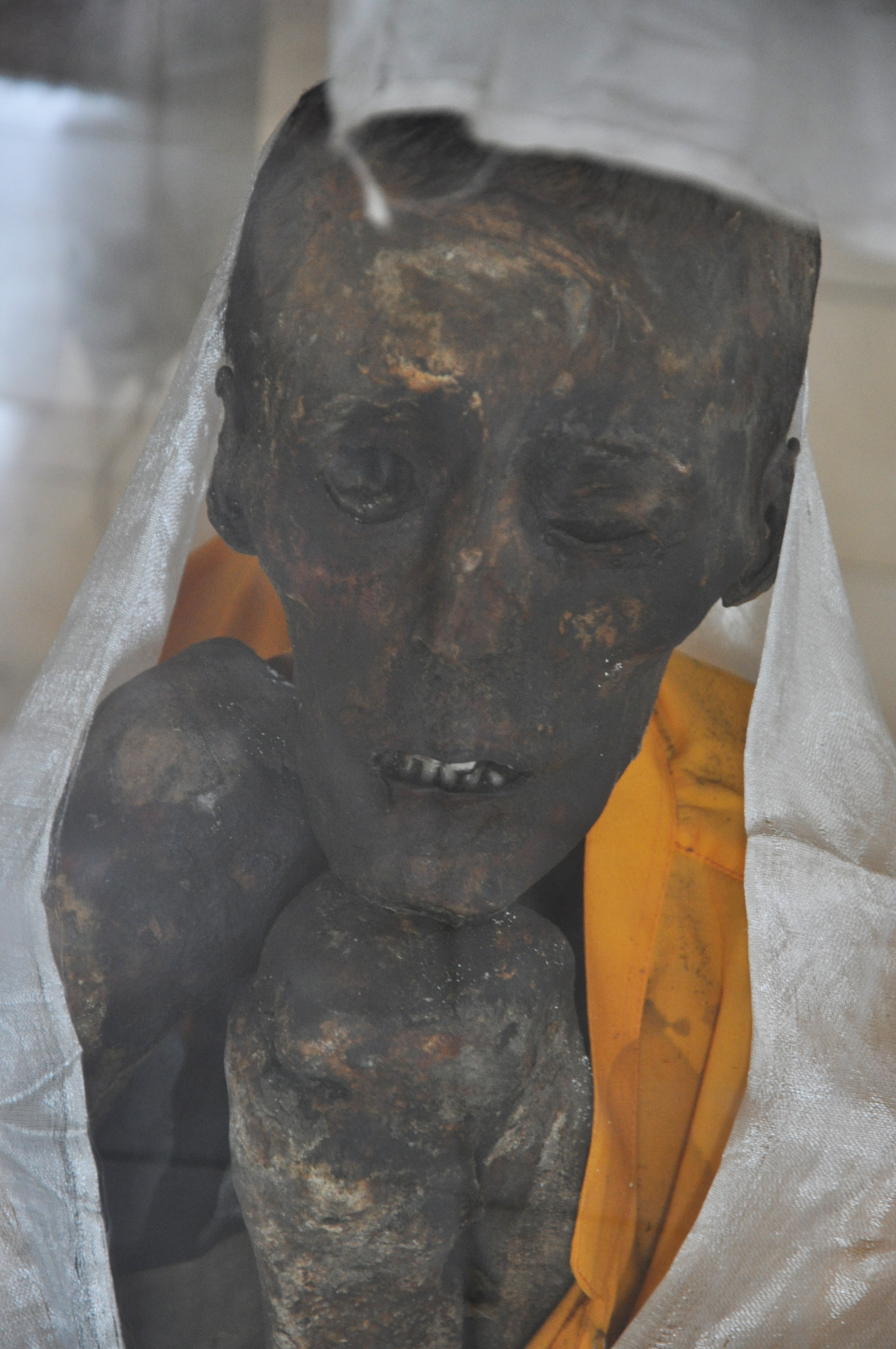
Mummy of Sangha Tenzin

The village has a Buddhist monastery, where a 500-year-old mummy of a late medieval Buddhist monk, Sangha Tenzin, is stored. The mummy is said to have been formed by a natural mummification process through austerities during the final stages of the monk's life.

== Sino-Indian border dispute ==
In 1847, when the British border commission headed by Alexander Cunningham went to the Indo-Tibetan border in the area, the commissioners were unobustructed till reaching Kaurik, but were prohibited from going beyond. They faced the emissaries of the governor of Gartok sent there for the purpose of pointing out the "ancient boundary between Ladakh and the Chinese territory". (Spiti was traditionally part of Ladakh.)

In December 1957, seven years after the Chinese annexation of Tibet, Chinese forces were said to have intruded at Kaurik, for which India lodged a protest. In 1959, after the Kongka La incident, China raised a number of disputes regarding the mutual border, including near Kaurik. The claims include the Gue village and valley.

During the 1990s, a joint working group of India and China held multiple meetings and exchaned maps of the "middle sector" of the border in 2000. Kaurik was identified as one of the locations where the claims of the two countries overlapped, and the disputed territory was estimated to be 250 square kilometres (97 sq mi).

== Transportation ==
Gue is connected to Sumdo via a road, and from Sumdo, through two national highways—the NH 5 Sumdo-Nako-Shimla Highway through Kinnaur district and the NH 505 Sumdo-Kaza-Gramphu-Manali highway through the Spiti River valley. The latter remains closed for 7 months due to winter snows on the Kunzum Pass (4,551 m or 14,931 ft). A dual-use airstrip, 100 km to the west, is under construction, scheduled to be completed in 2024.

== Nearby villages ==
Nearby villages include

- Kaurik
- Tabo (Spiti)
- Dhankar
- Kaza (Spiti)
- Kibber
- Nako
- Korzok
