= Kaurik =

Kaurik Khyuré
- Village
- Interactive map of Kaurik
- Location in Himachal Pradesh Kaurik (India)
- Coordinates: 32.096°N 78.673°E
- Country: India
- State: Himachal Pradesh
- District: Lahul and Spiti
- Tehsil: Spiti

Area
  - Total: 60.01 km^{2} (23.17 sq mi)
- Elevation: 3,690 m (12,110 ft)

Population (2011)
  - Total: 288
- Time zone: UTC+5:30 (IST)

Kaurik, originally Khyuré, (Note: Other spellings: Khyuri, Kyuri, and Kyurik. The Chinese spelling is Chinese: 曲惹; pinyin: Qū rě. It was transliterated as "Chuje" in 1960. "Churi" is another transliteration found in some sources.) is a village in the Lahul and Spiti district, in Himachal Pradesh, India. It is in the valley of the Pare Chu river before its confluence with the Spiti River. Kaurik is close to the border with Tibet, the opposite side on the Tibetan side being the Tsosib Sumkyil Township (Churup Sumkhel). China claims the village as part of its Tsamda County, Tibet.

== Geography ==
Kaurik lies in the Zanskar Range on the bank of the Pare Chu river (or Parang River). Pare Chu originates in Spiti and takes a circuitous route through Ladakh and Ngari Khorsum, finally reentering Spiti at Kaurik. It joins the Spiti River at Sumdo about 20 km to the southwest.

Kaurik is situated on a flat at an elevation of 3,690 m (12,110 ft), halfway up the ridge that forms the India–China border (Line of Actual Control) at this location. The ridge itself rises to an elevation of 4600 m above Kaurik. The closest border point is about 700 m to the east, where the Pare Chu river crosses into Spiti. There is a border post called Lepcha at this location.

Across the border is the village of Churup (Tsurup), the seat of the Tsosib Sumkyil Township in Tsamda County of the Tibet region of China.

== Demographics ==
In 1975, landslides during an earthquake completely destroyed the village situated in Kaurik, Largest number of survivors of Kaurik village now reside in Hurling village in this area. The ruins of Kaurik are in a restricted area under Indo-Tibetan Border Police (ITBP) control.

== Sino-Indian border dispute ==
In 1847, when the British border commission headed by Alexander Cunningham went to the Indo-Tibetan border at Kaurik, the commissioners were unobustructed till reaching that place, but were prohibited from going beyond. They faced the emissaries of the governor of Gartok sent there for the purpose of pointing out the "ancient boundary between Ladakh and the Chinese territory". (Spiti was traditionally part of Ladakh.)

In December 1957, seven years after the Chinese annexation of Tibet, Chinese forces were said to have intruded at Kaurik, for which India lodged a protest. In 1959, after the Kongka La incident, that China raised a number of disputes regarding the mutual border, including at Kaurik. However, there have been no clashes at this location till date.

During the 1990s, a joint working group of India and China held multiple meetings and exchaned maps of the "middle sector" of the border in 2000. Kaurik was identified as one of the locations where the claims of the two countries overlapped, and the disputed territory was estimated to be 250 square kilometres (97 sq mi). It is believed that the Chinese claim extends down to Sumdo, and includes the Gue village and valley.

== Transportation ==
Kaurik is connected to the rest of India through the Kaurik–Sumdo Road, and from Sumdo, through two national highways—NH 5 (Sumdo-Nako-Shimla Highway) through Kinnaur district and NH 505 (Sumdo-Kaza-Gramphu-Manali highway) through the Spiti River valley. The latter remains closed for 7 months due to winter snows on the Kunzum Pass (4,551 m or 14,931 ft). A dual-use airstrip, 100 km to the west, is under construction, scheduled to be completed in 2024.

== See also ==
- Gue, Himachal Pradesh
- Sumdo, Himachal Pradesh
