= Tsosib Sumkyil Township =

Tsosib Sumkyil ཚོ་སྲིབ་གསུམ་དཀྱིལ Churup Sumkhel, Chulusongjie
- Location within Tibet Autonomous Region
- Coordinates: 32°6′N 78°42′E
- Country: China
- Region: Tibet Autonomous Region
- Prefecture: Ngari
- County: Zanda

Population
  - Total
  - Major Nationalities: Tibetan
  - Regional dialect: Tibetan language
- Time zone: +8

Map 1: Tsosib Sumkyil Township (Note: The borders shown are those of the Large Scale International Boundaries dataset produced by the US Office of the Geographer, 2012.)

Tsosib Sumkyil (Tibetan: ཚོ་སྲིབ་གསུམ་དཀྱིལ, Wylie: tsho srib gsum dkyil, THL: tso sip sum kyil) or Churup Sumkhel (Tibetan: སུ་རུ་གསུམ་འཁྱིལ, Wylie: su ru gsum 'khyil, THL: su ru sum khyil) is the westernmost township of the Zanda County in the Ngari Prefecture, Tibet region of China. It borders India's Spiti region in Himachal Pradesh as well as Rupshu region in Ladakh. The region is watered by the Pare Chu river, a tributary of the Spiti River and an upstream tributary of the Sutlej river. China has ongoing border disputes with India for the southwestern border of the region near Kaurik and the northern border near Chumar.

== Name ==
The township is named after two villages, both of which appear to have two native names.

Tsosib (Tibetan: ཚོ་སྲིབ, Wylie: tsho srib, THL: tso sip, also spelt Tsosip, Cosib and Cosip) or Churup (Tibetan: སུ་རུ, Wylie: su ru, THL: su ru, also spelt Tsurup) is a border village on the bank of Pare Chu just before the river enters the Indian Spiti district (32.1131°N 78.7114°E).

Sumkyil or Sumkhel (Tibetan: གསུམ་དཀྱིལ, Wylie: gsum dkyil, THL: sum kyil or Tibetan: གསུམ་འཁྱིལ, Wylie: gsum 'khyil, THL: sum khyil, also spelt Sumkyi, Sumgyi, Somgyi and Sonjie) is a farming village on a tributary of Pare Chu called Sumkyil Chu. (32.1467°N 78.7766°E).

The Sumkyil Chu stream flows through a wide enough valley to support several farming villages along its course, including Manja (Chinese: 曼扎; pinyin: Màn zhā), Tuntun (Chinese: 顿堆; pinyin: Dùn duī) and Azire (Chinese: 阿孜热; pinyin: Ā zī rè). The reference to Sumkyil in the name of the township could also to the entire Sumkyil valley.

The historical name of the region was Tsotso, or Tocho.

== Geography ==
The region of the Tsosib Sumkyil Township is entirely mountainous, with the western parts belonging to the Zanskar Range and the eastern parts belonging to the Ladakh Range. The Pare Chu river flows between the two, entering the region from Rupshu in the north. Several tributaries drain into the river from both sides, with the Sumkyil Chu being one of the last. The Sumkyil Chu valley is well-populated with several farming villages dotting the valley. After the junction with Sumkyil Chu, the Pare Chu river flows southwest and enters Indian territory between Tsosib and Kaurik.

== History ==
A part of the township used to be part of Spiti, which was in turn part of the Zanskar and Ladakh kingdoms till the early 18th century. During the border talks between China and India in 1960, the Indian delegates presented evidence of the region being under Ladakhi control during the reign of Nyima Namgyal (r. 1691–1729). Mentioned in the records were the villages of Kaurik, Gue (Gyu), Shaktot, Tsurup, Sumkyil, Kharak and Bargyok (Berchok).

The region appears to have become part of Tibet sometime before Ladakh came under the control of Dogras. In 1847, when the British boundary commissioners were sent to the region, they found the boundary of Spiti to be located at Khyuri [Kaurik].

== See also ==
- List of towns and villages in Tibet

== Bibliography ==
- India, Ministry of External Affairs, ed. (1962), Report of the Officials of the Governments of India and the People's Republic of China on the Boundary Question, Government of India Press
- Kaul, Hriday Nath (2003), India China Boundary in Kashmir, Gyan Publishing House, ISBN 978-81-212-0826-0
- Strachey, Henry (1854), Physical Geography of Western Tibet, London: William Clows and Sons – via archive.org
