= Kunzum Pass =

Mountain pass in the Indian Himalayas

Kunzum La
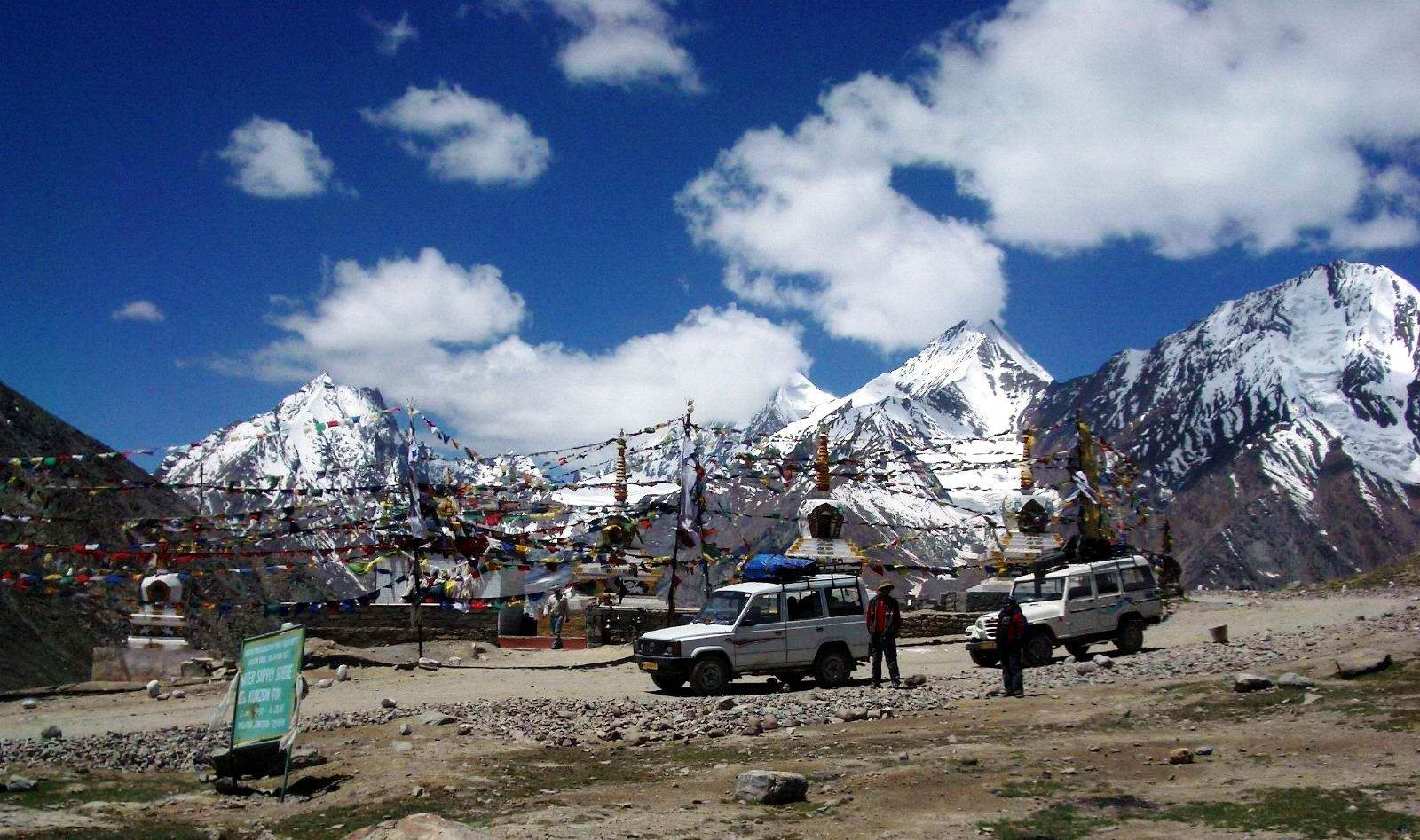
- Kunzum Pass between Lahaul & Spiti
- Interactive map of Kunzum La
- Elevation: 5,051 m (16,572 ft)
- Traversed by: Kaza-Keylong

Location
- Location: Himachal, India
- Range: Kunzum, Himalayas
- Coordinates: 32.415798°N 77.648528°E

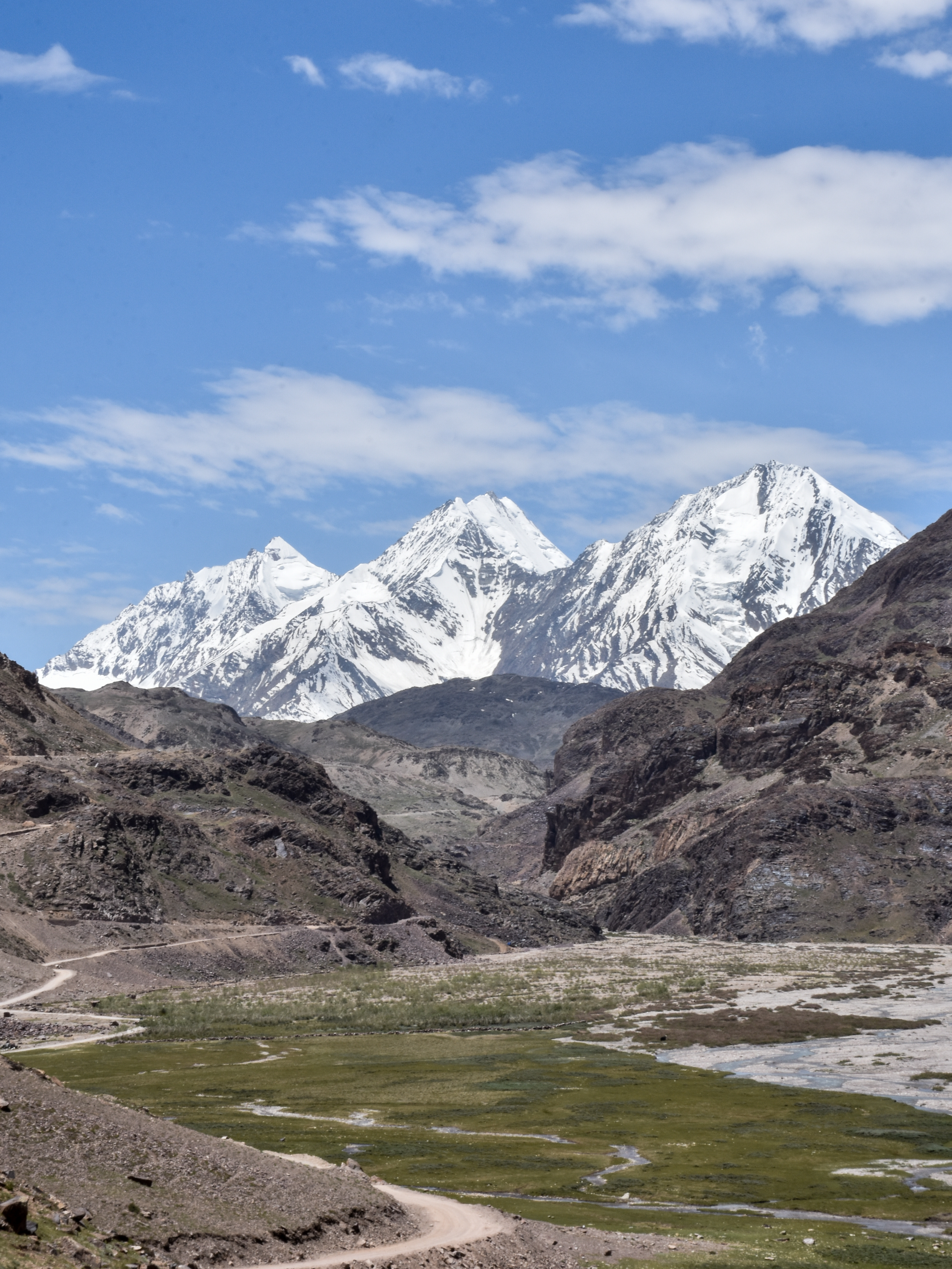
Road from Losar on the Spiti side up to Kunzum La Pass. Mountains on the Lahaul side of the Kunzum Pass.

Kunzum Pass (Tibetan: Kunzum La, elev. 4,969 m or 16,302 ft), is a high mountain pass in the eastern Kunzum Range of the Himalayas. It connects Lahaul valley and Spiti valley. It is on the route from Gramphoo in Lahaul to Kaza the subdivisional headquarters of Spiti. Kunzum Pass on NH505 is 122 km (76 mi) from Manali, and 79 km (49 mi) from Kaza.

== Transport ==
NH505 over the Kunzum Pass connects Kaza to Manali in the southwest, and Kaurik, Sumdo, Pooh, & Tabo in east. Kaza-Pooh-Tabo-Shimla route is open the whole year, but the Manali-Kaza route is closed for 7 winter months every year, during which Kunzum Pass (15,000 ft) is closed. NHAI is planning to construct a tunnel under the Kunzum Pass to provide all-weather connectivity between Manali and the Spiti valley. The Kunzum Pass is normally open from June/July to October/November. The dates of opening and closing are dependent on the weather and road repair by the Border Roads Organisation.

NH505 from the Manali-Gramphoo side in the west climbs steeply through fifteen (15) sharp hairpin turns from Batal (el. 4,000 m or 13,000 ft) on the Chandra River, testing the driving skills of even experienced drivers. On the Kaza side in east, the road from the small town of Losar (el. 4,076 m or 13,373 ft) runs on the right bank of a tributary of the Spiti. It climbs through a dry, semi-desert landscape 22 km (14 mi) up to the Kunzum Pass.

== Tourism ==
Many drivers and travelers seek blessings of Kunzum Mata before continuing on the dangerous journey. There is also a 15 km trek to Chandratal, the Moon Lake, from the Kunzum La.

== Climate ==
Climate data for Kunzum Pass, elevation 4,551 m (14,931 ft), (1991–2020, extremes 1962–2020)
Month	Jan	Feb	Mar	Apr	May	Jun	Jul	Aug	Sep	Oct	Nov	Dec	Year
Mean daily maximum °C (°F)	−26 (−15)	−28 (−18)	−19 (−2)	−10 (14)	−7 (19)	2 (36)	4 (39)	7 (45)	8 (46)	1 (34)	−12 (10)	−20 (−4)	−8 (17)
Mean daily minimum °C (°F)	−40 (−40)	−41 (−42)	−36 (−33)	−28 (−18)	−20 (−4)	−12 (10)	−10 (14)	−9 (16)	−8 (18)	−14 (7)	−30 (−22)	−38 (−36)	−24 (−11)
Average rainfall mm (inches)	19 (0.7)	22 (0.9)	24 (0.9)	30 (1.2)	10 (0.4)	7 (0.3)	3 (0.1)	9 (0.4)	7 (0.3)	4 (0.2)	2 (0.1)	12 (0.5)	149 (6)
Source: India Meteorological Department

== Gallery ==
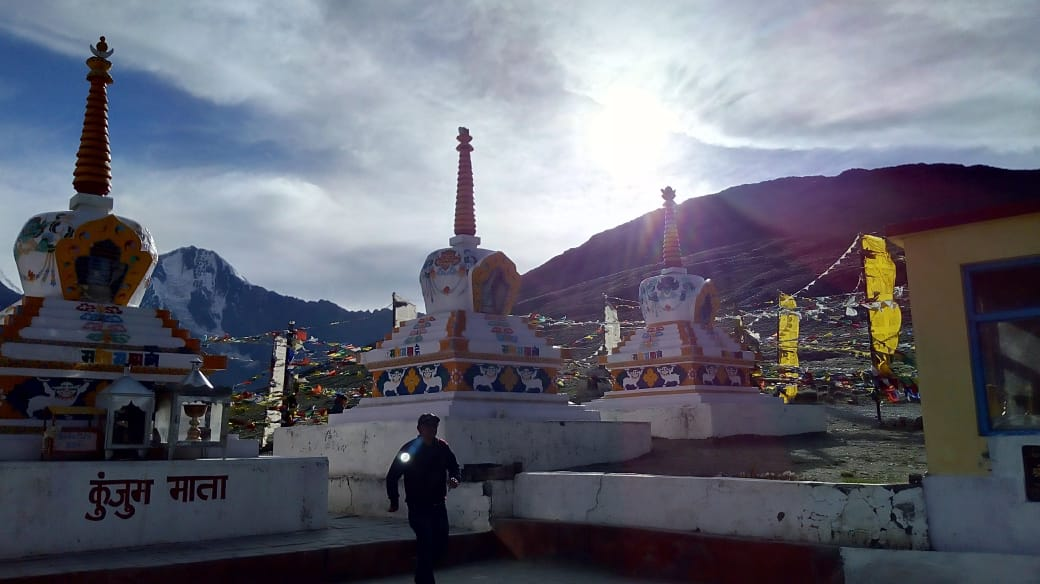
Kunzom Shrine

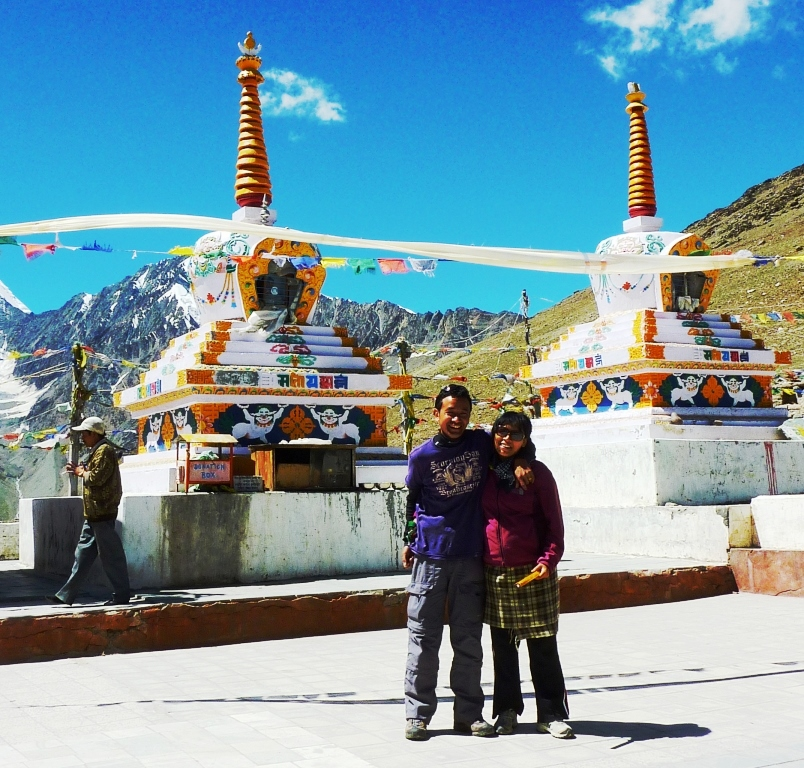
Young Tibetan couple at Kunzum Pass

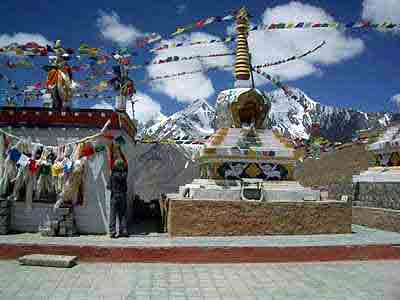
Kunzum Mata temple

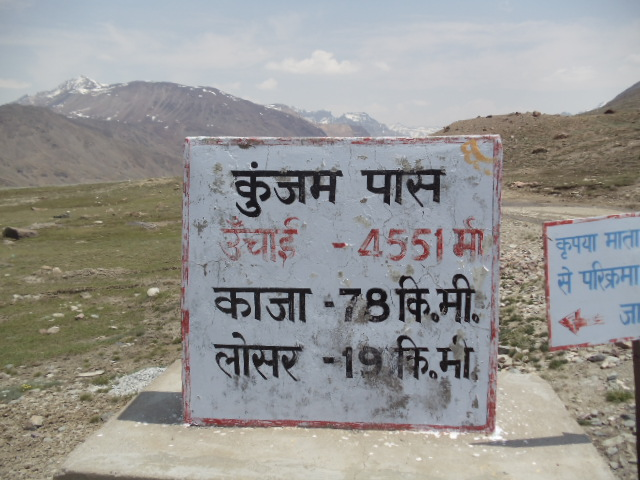
Kunzum La, Lahaul & Spiti Himachal Pradesh

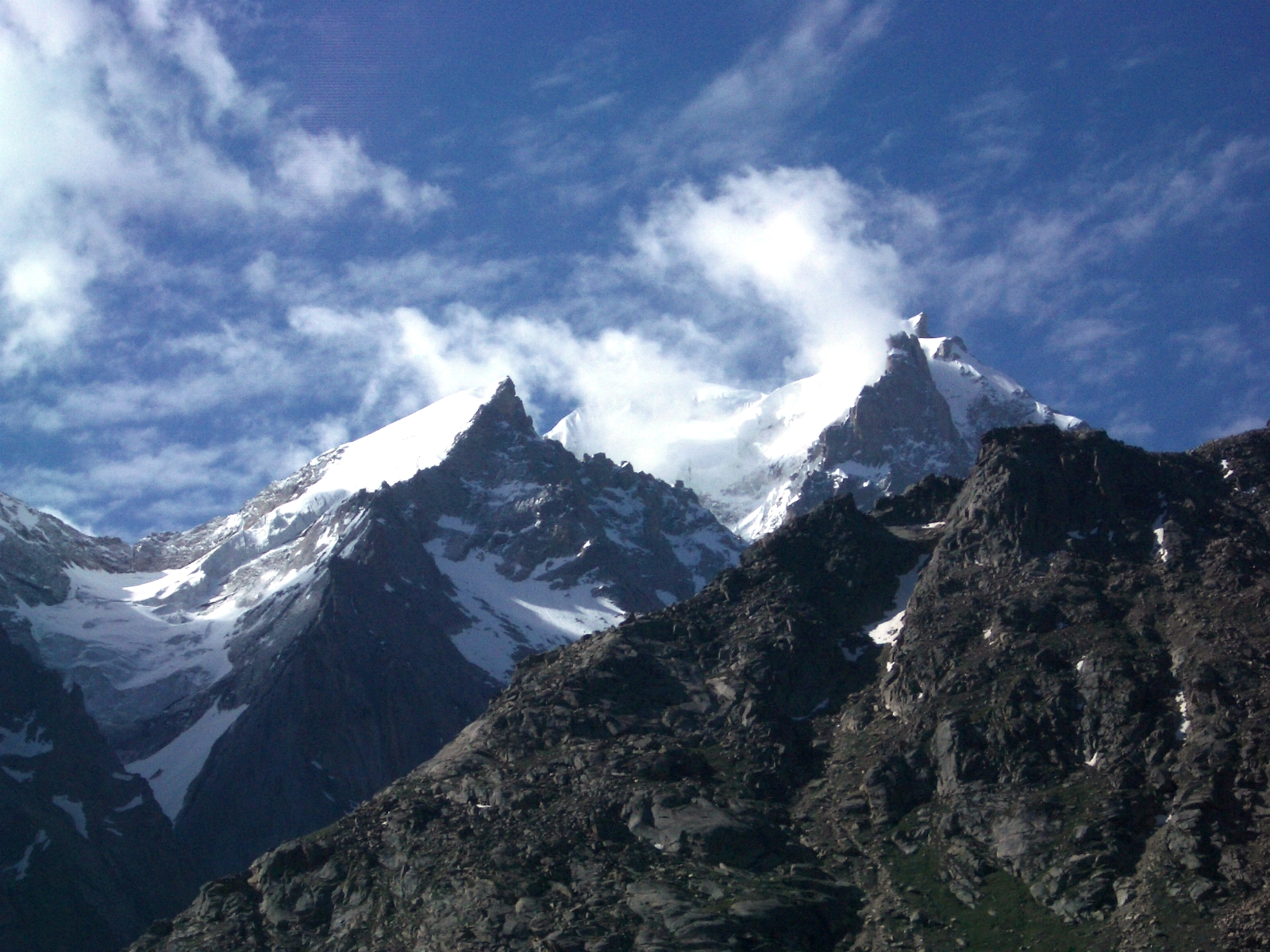
Mountain peaks as seen from Kunzum Pass between Lahaul and Spiti
