= National Highway 505 (India) =

National Highway in Himachal Pradesh, India

National Highway 505
- Map of National Highway 505 in red
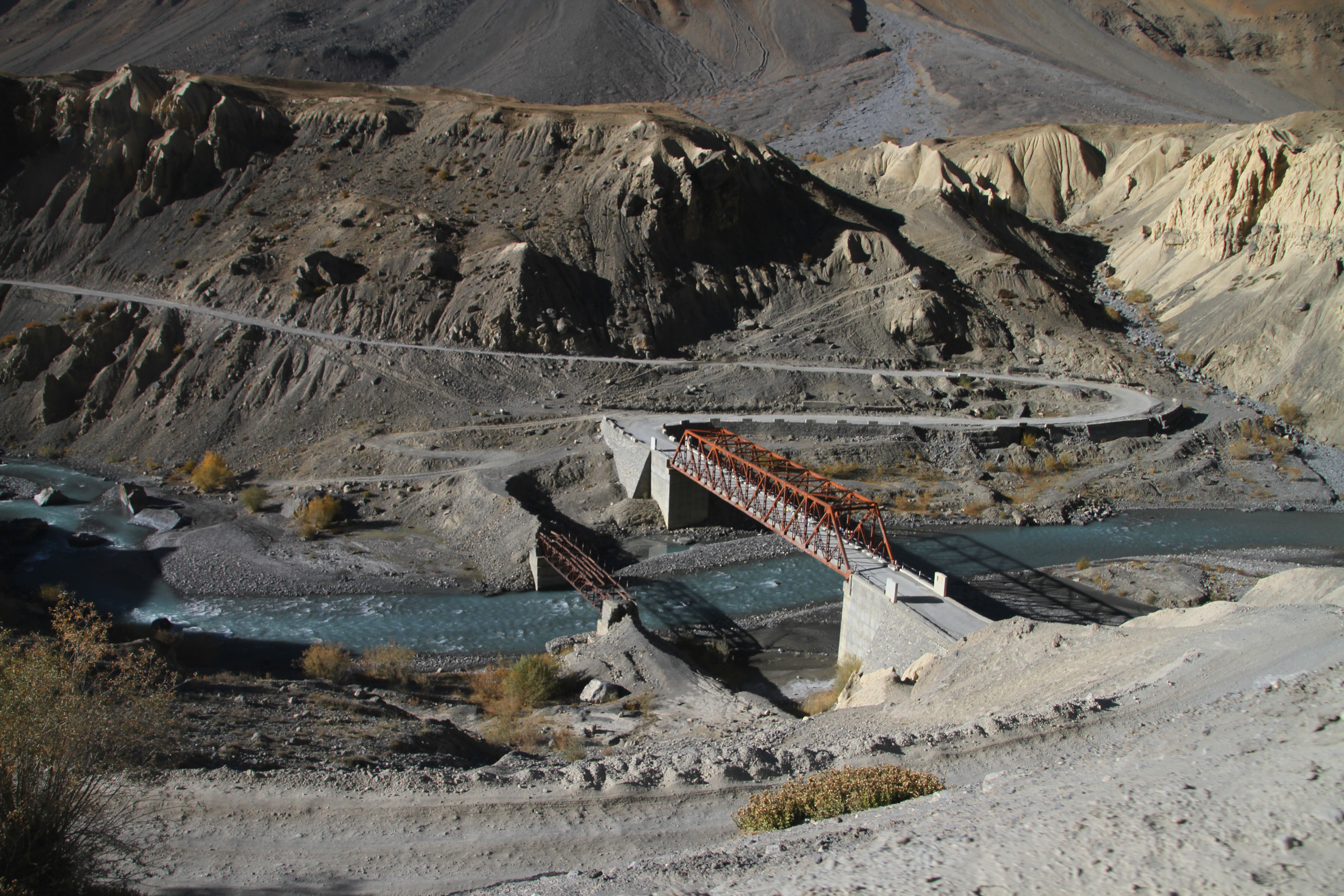
- Bridge across Spiti River

Route information
- Auxiliary route of NH 5
- Length: 275 km (171 mi)

Major junctions
- East end: Khab
- West end: Gramphoo

Location
- Country: India
- States: Himachal Pradesh

Highway system
- Roads in India; Expressways; National; State; Asian
← NH 5	→ NH 3

National Highway 505, commonly called NH 505, is a national highway in India. It is a spur road of National Highway 5. NH 505 traverses the state of Himachal Pradesh in India. NH 505 is a high elevation road, covering the Kinnaur and Lahaul and Spiti districts of Himachal Pradesh, mainly running along the Spiti River in the Spiti Valley. The highway from Kaza to Gramphu remains closed for 6–9 months in a year due to heavy snowfall and the closure of Kunzum La pass at an elevation of 4,550 m (14,930 ft).

== Overview ==
National Highway 505 was designated as Himachal State Highway 30 prior to its being named on 4 March 2014 as a national highway. The highway runs through the high-elevation, cold desert area of the Lahaul and Spiti valleys of Himachal, which area receive negligible rainfall. The terrain is barren and treacherous, prone to landslides and disruptions. The road is narrow and rough at places, and crosses the high-elevation Kunzum pass, requiring good driving skills in mountains.

NH 505 has been of key importance to the growth of a cash crop economy, mass tourism, and the expansion of telecommunications in Spiti. This highway provides connectivity to some major Buddhist monasteries and various other interesting places.

== Route ==
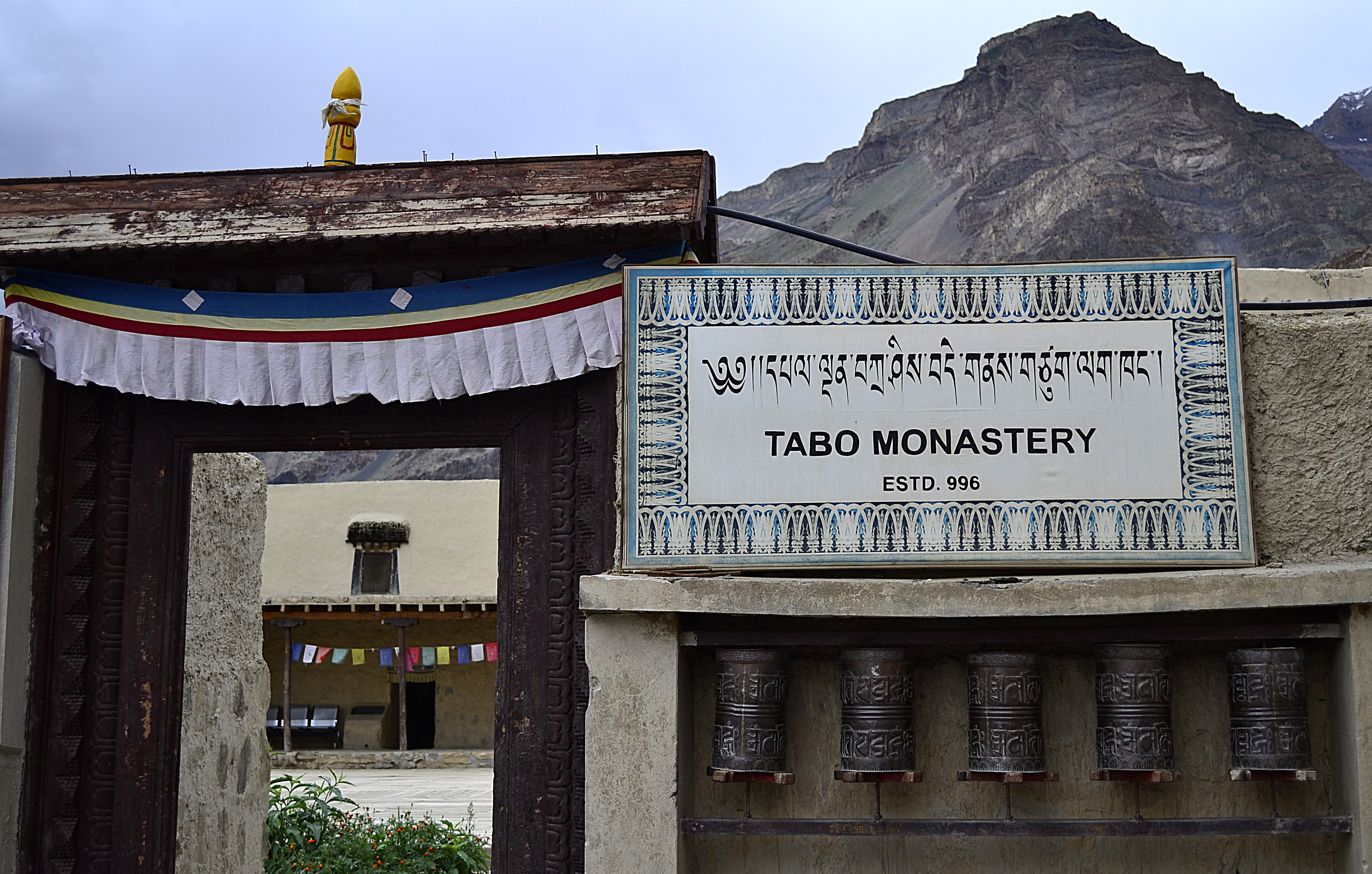
Tabo Monastery

The route of NH 505 starts at the Khab Sangam in Kinnaur district from National Highway 5. It runs along the Spiti Valley through Kinnaur and enters Lahaul and Spiti district at Sumdo. It continues up the Spiti Valley to Kunzum Pass. It descends and follows the Chandra River to the terminus at Gramphoo.

Distances
Town/Village	Up	Down
Khab Sangam	0 km (0 mi)	273 km (170 mi)
Nako	26 km (16 mi)	247 km (153 mi)
Chango	48 km (30 mi)	225 km (140 mi)
Sumdo	62 km (39 mi)	211 km (131 mi)
Hurling	70 km (43 mi)	203 km (126 mi)
Tabo	89 km (55 mi)	184 km (114 mi)
Kaza	135 km (84 mi)	138 km (86 mi)
Losar	192 km (119 mi)	81 km (50 mi)
Kunzum Pass	210 km (130 mi)	63 km (39 mi)
Batal	221 km (137 mi)	52 km (32 mi)
Chhatru	253 km (157 mi)	20 km (12 mi)
Gramphoo	273 km (170 mi)	0 km (0 mi)

=== Kinnaur district ===
The terminus at Khab, Kinnaur district is the preferred point of entry to the Spiti Valley which is located at an average elevation of 3,350 m (10,990 ft). This mostly all-weather access point to Spiti Valley from Khab is at an elevation of about 2,600 m (8,500 ft). Travelling from Chandigarh or Shimla to Khab gives a chance for travellers to gradually acclimatize themselves to avoid altitude sickness. NH 505 climbs steeply from Khab Sangam up to Nako (3,662 m (12,014 ft)). It descends to Chango on the Spiti River, then enters Lahaul and Spiti district at Sumdo.

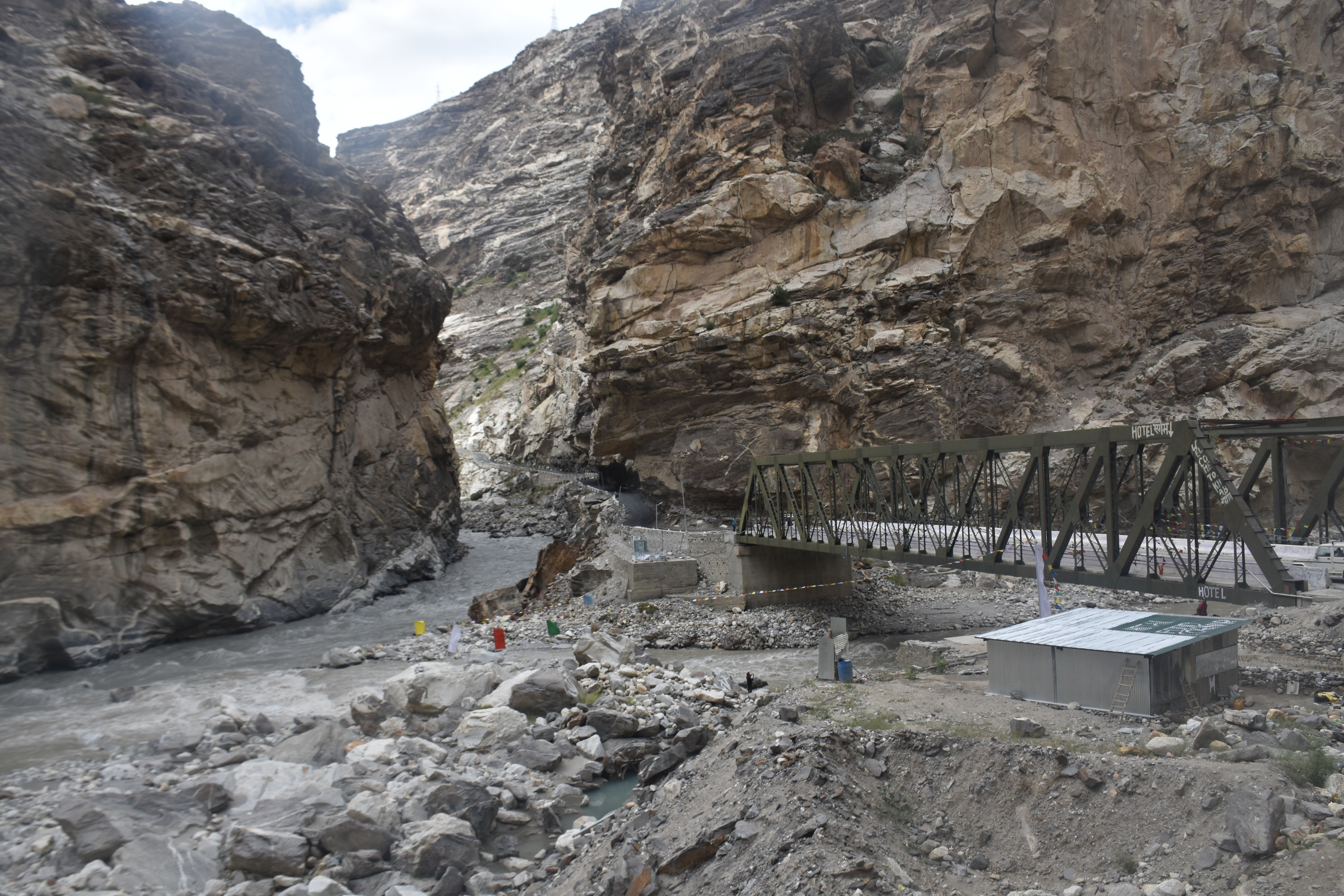
NH 505 enters Spiti Valley from bridge over Sutlej River

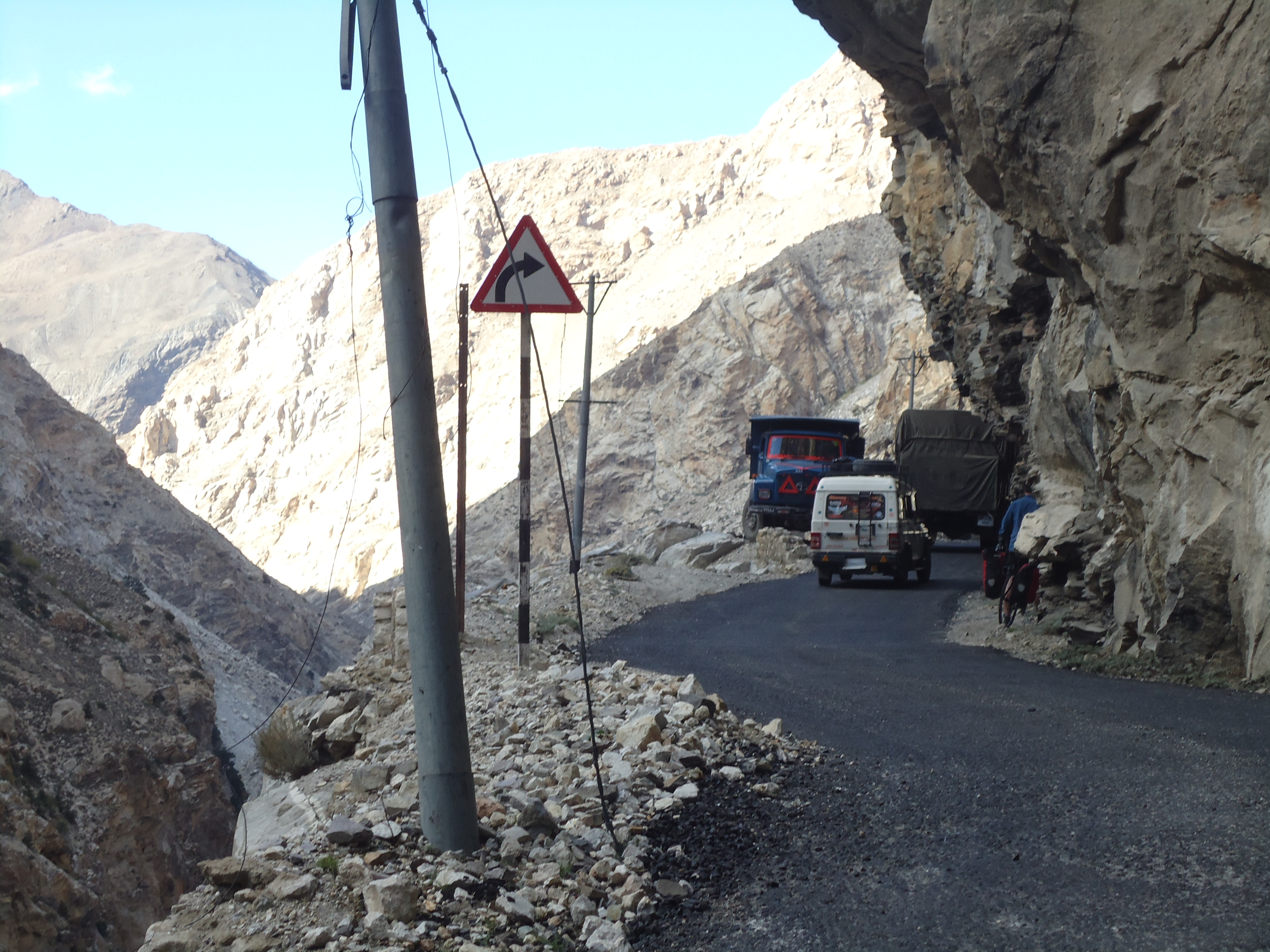
En route from Khab to Nako

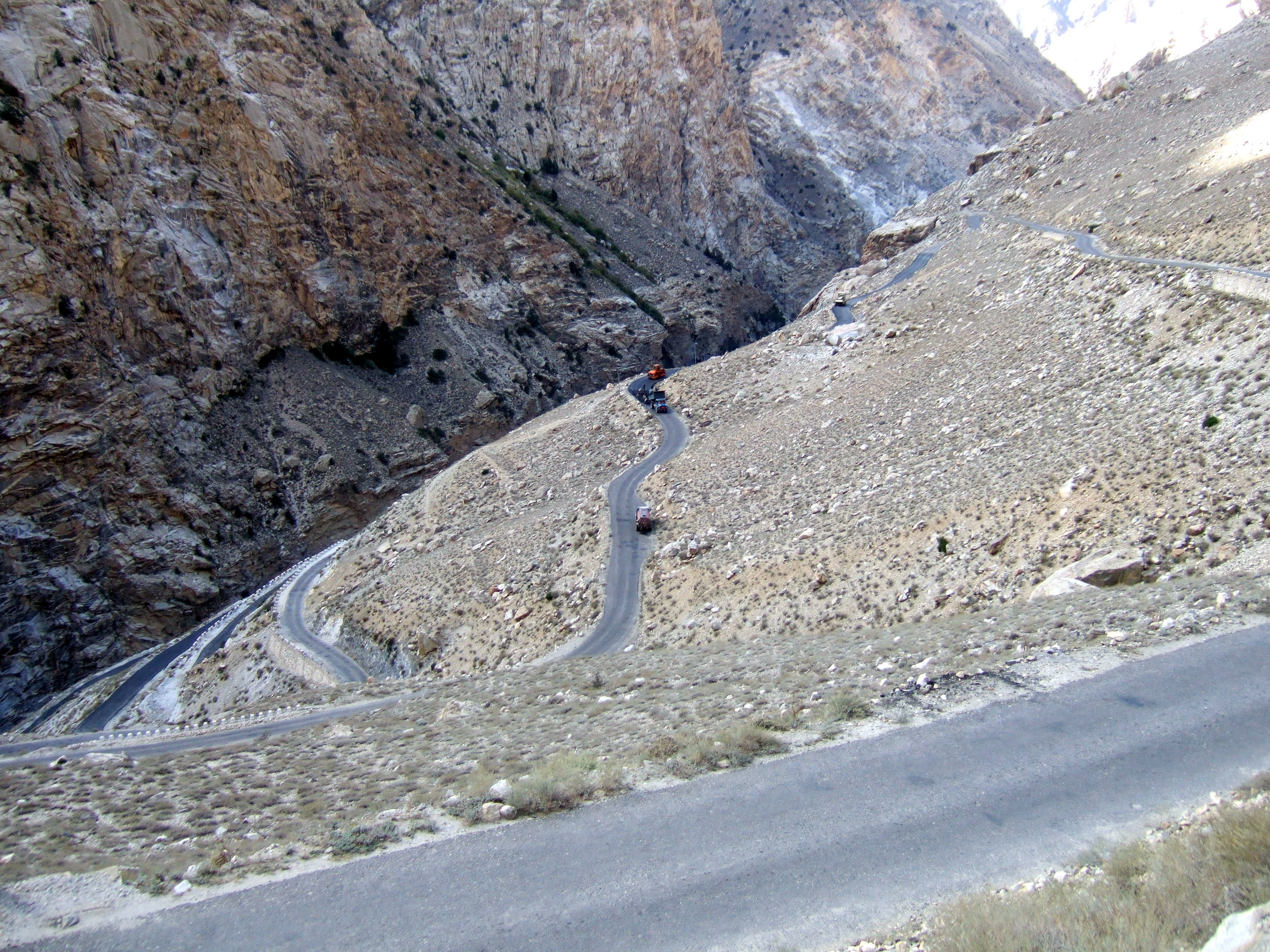
Switchback hairpin bends climbing to Nako

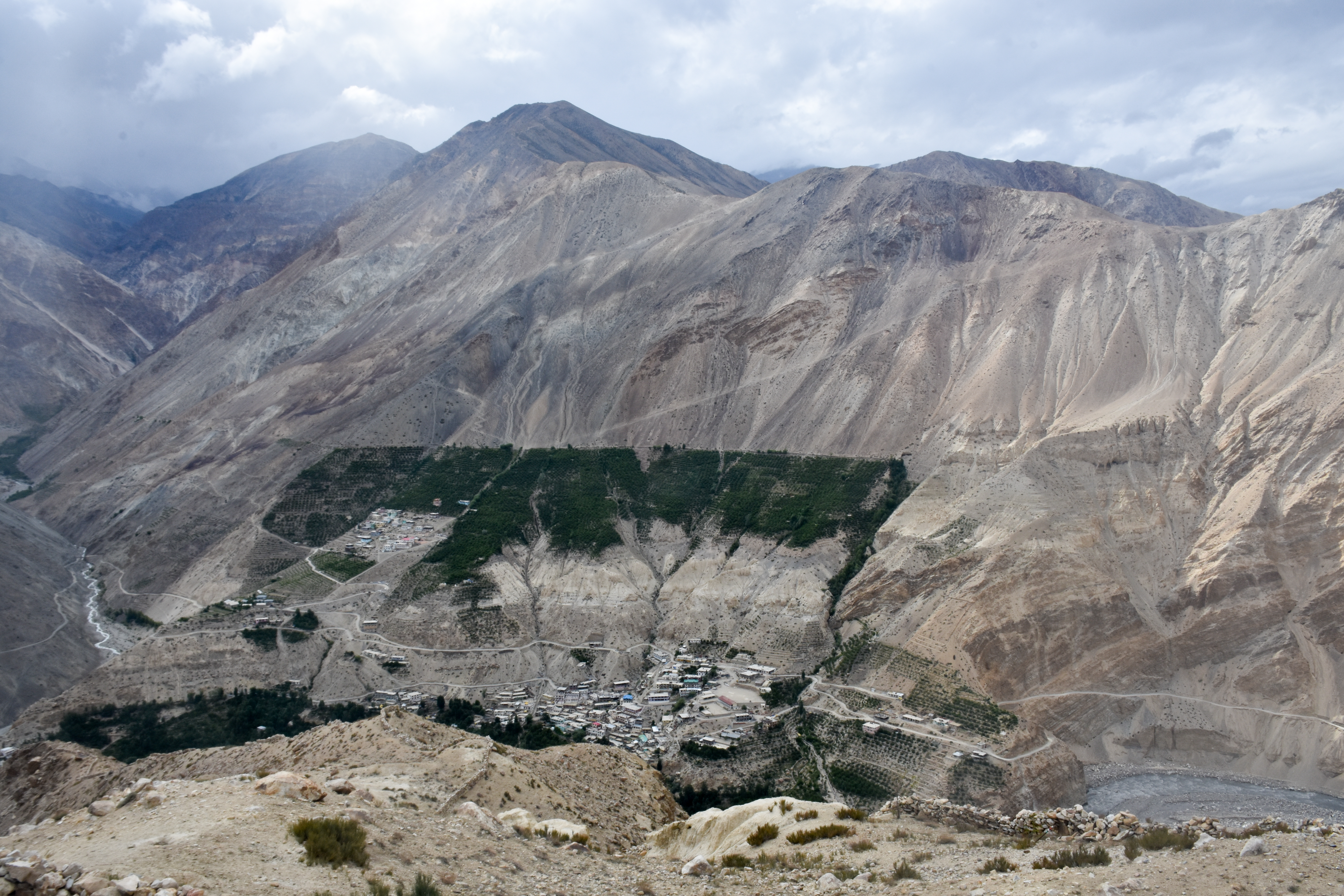
Leo village on right bank of Spiti, opp. Nako

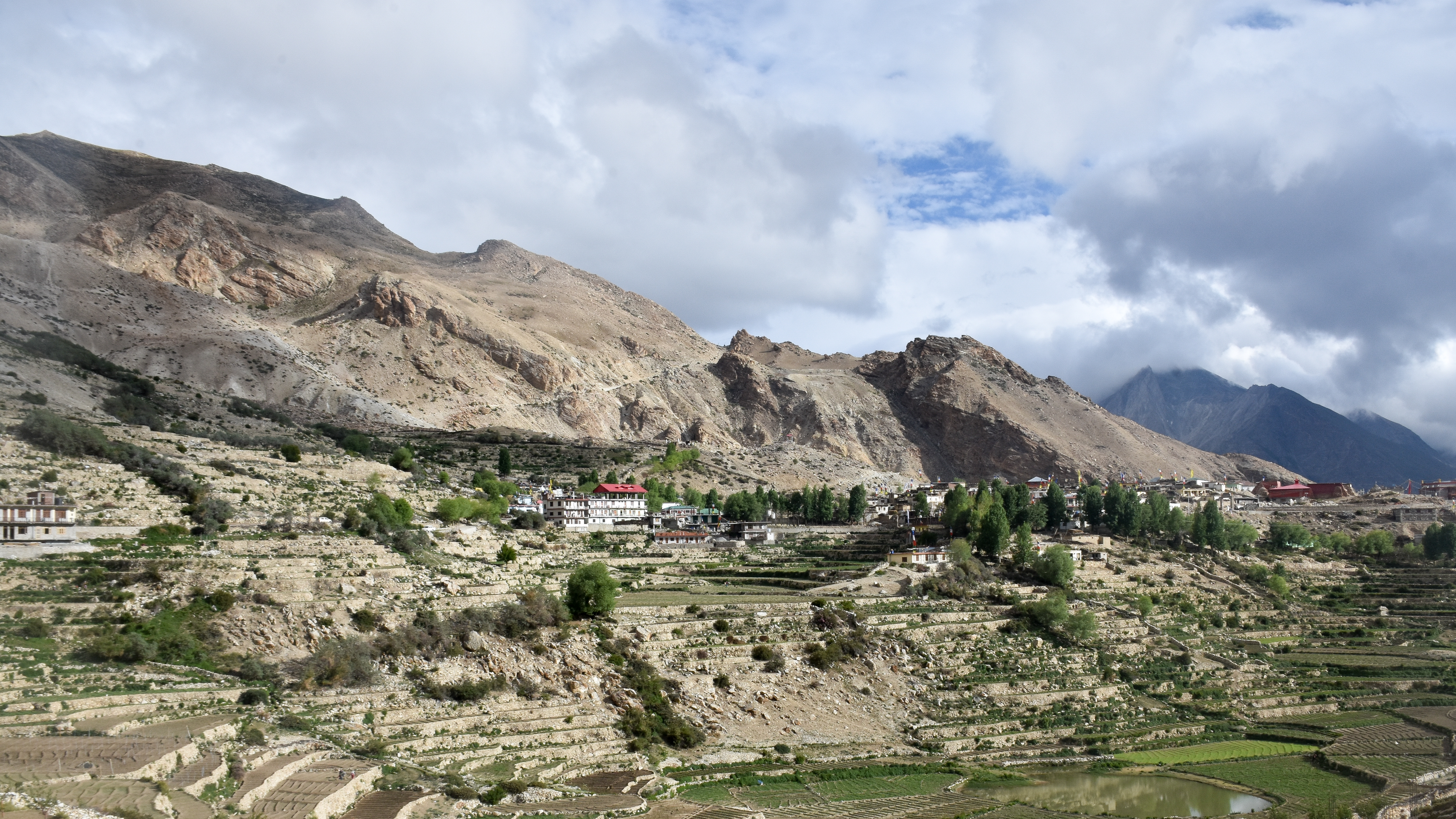
Nako village from NH 505

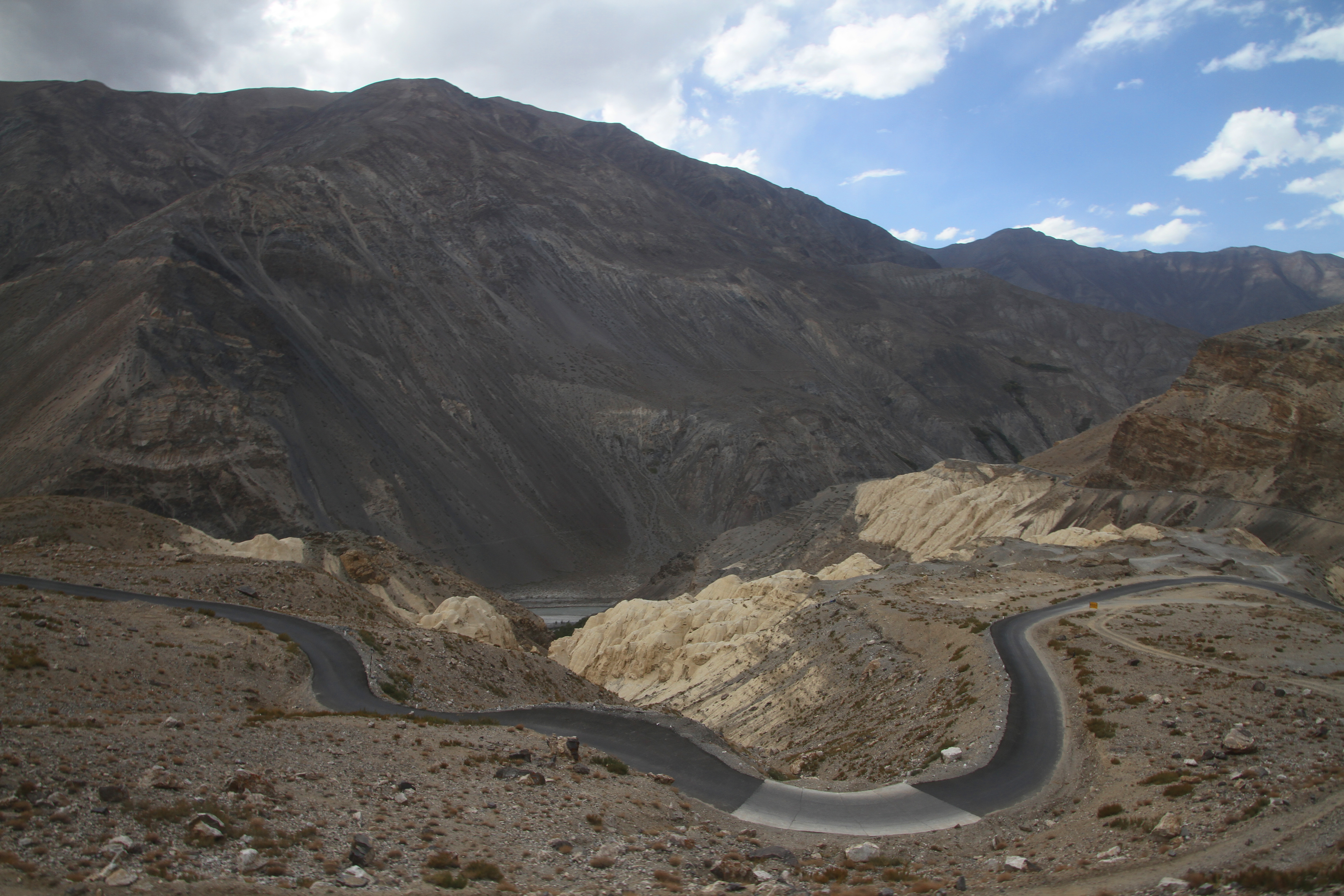
En route from Nako to Chango

=== Lahaul and Spiti district ===
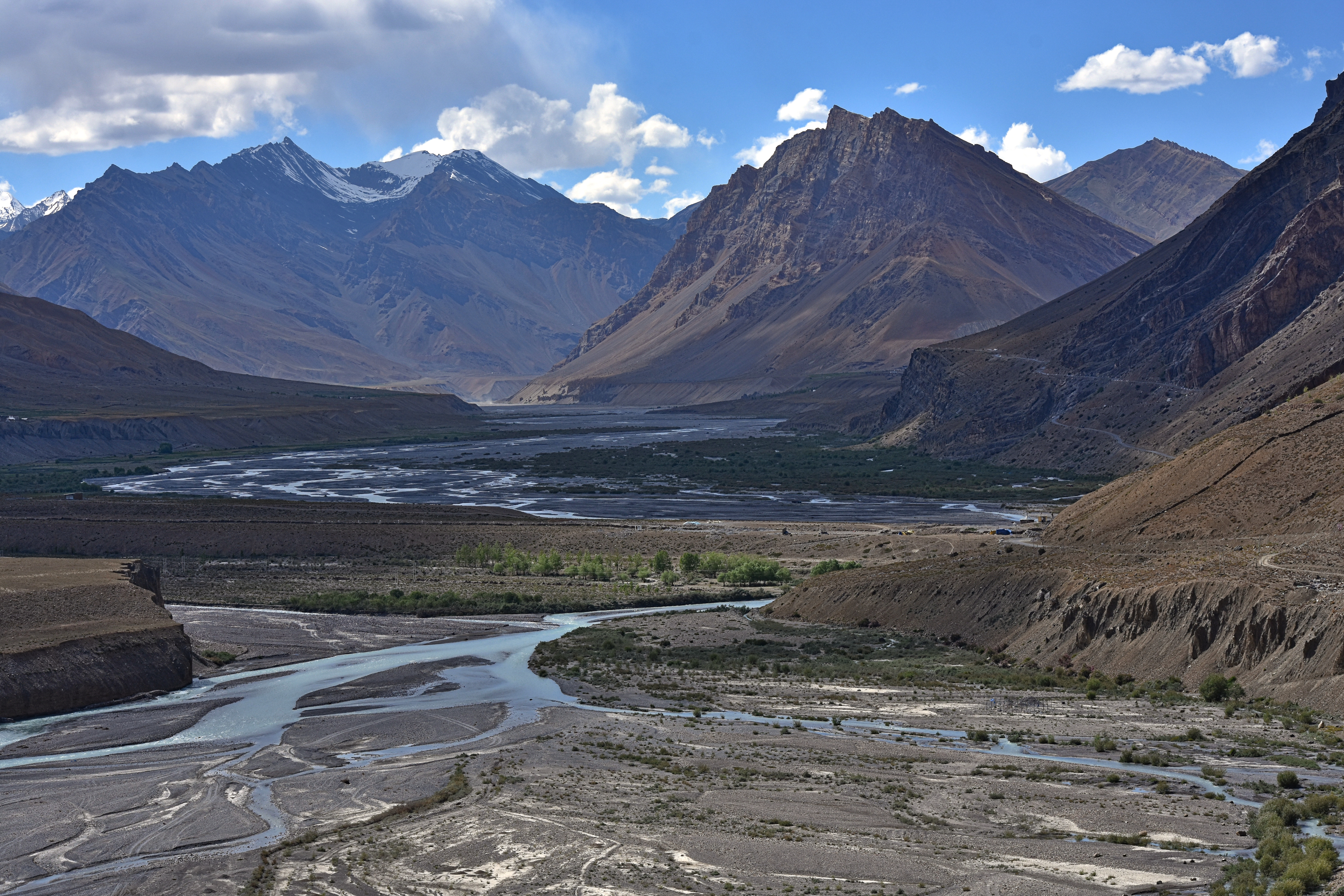
Broad riverbed of Spiti river above Kaza, Kaza-Kibber road on right

From Sumdo, NH 505 runs mostly alongside the Spiti river for about 130 km (81 mi) until Losar. After passing through Hurling, the next town is Tabo with the well-known Tabo Monastery and caves. The highway passes through some unusual clay pillars en route to Kaza, the largest town in the Spiti Valley. Near Lingti, 15 km (9.3 mi) before Kaza, the 33 km (21 mi) road to Pin Valley National Park branches off over the Attargo Bridge to the right bank of the Spiti. On the Tabo side of Lingti is the road to the Dhanker Monastery. In this section, the riverbed is very wide, up to 500 m (1,600 ft) in places. The river itself is much narrower and meanders in braids along the broad riverbed.

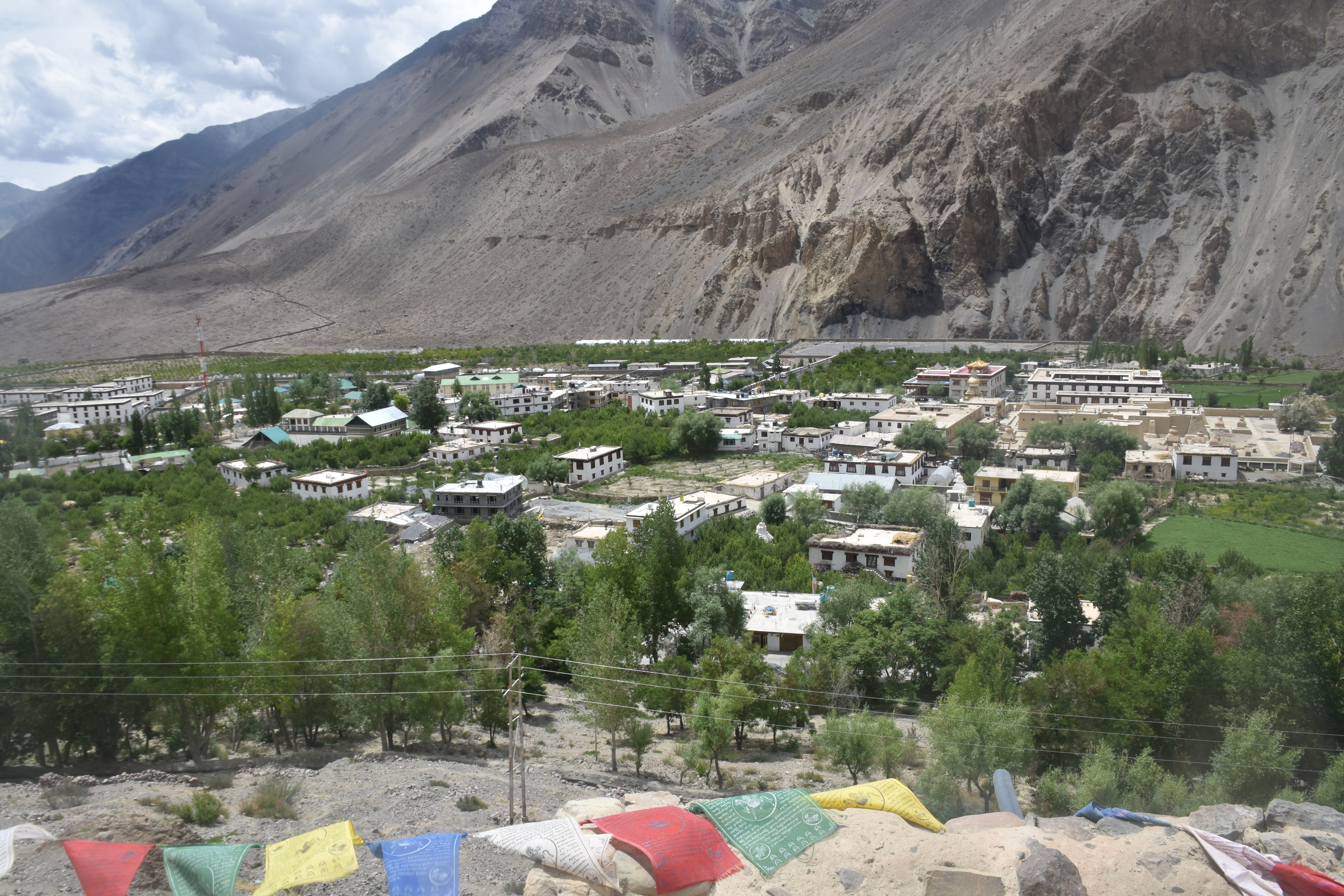
Tabo with Spiti River beneath distant cliff, June '18

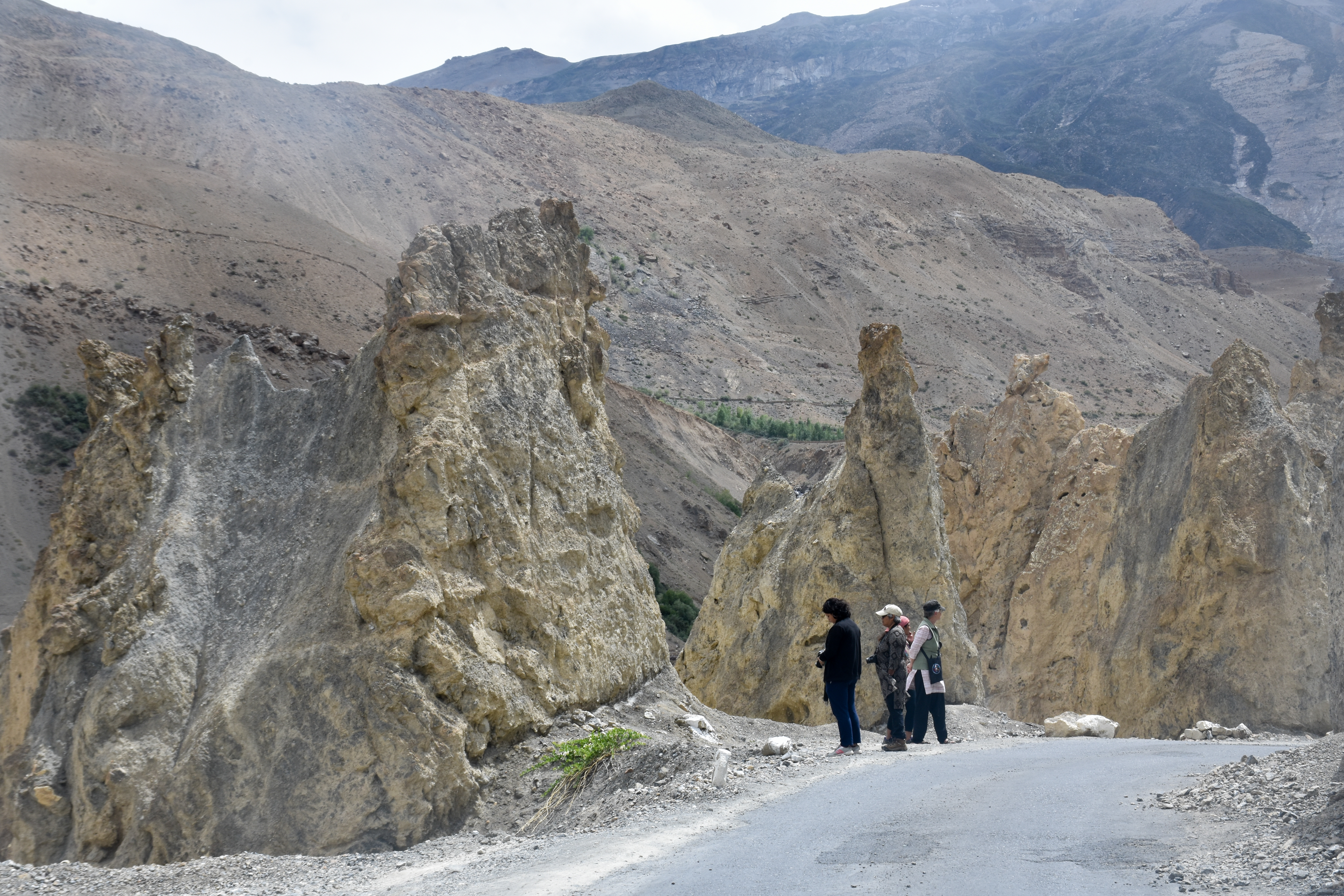
Clay pillars, Tabo - Lingti, June '18

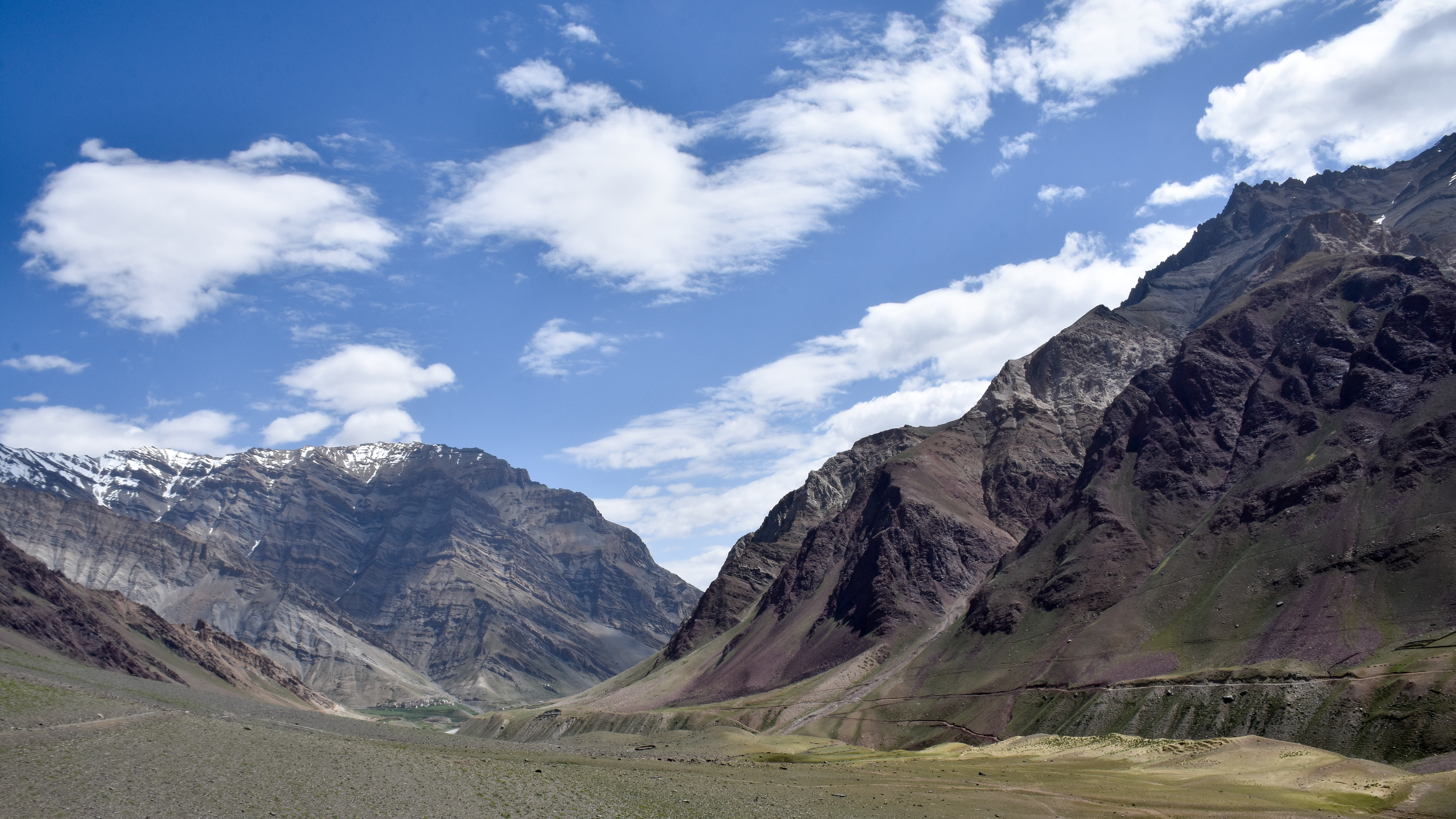
Pin Valley Nat'l Park, Mudh village, June '18

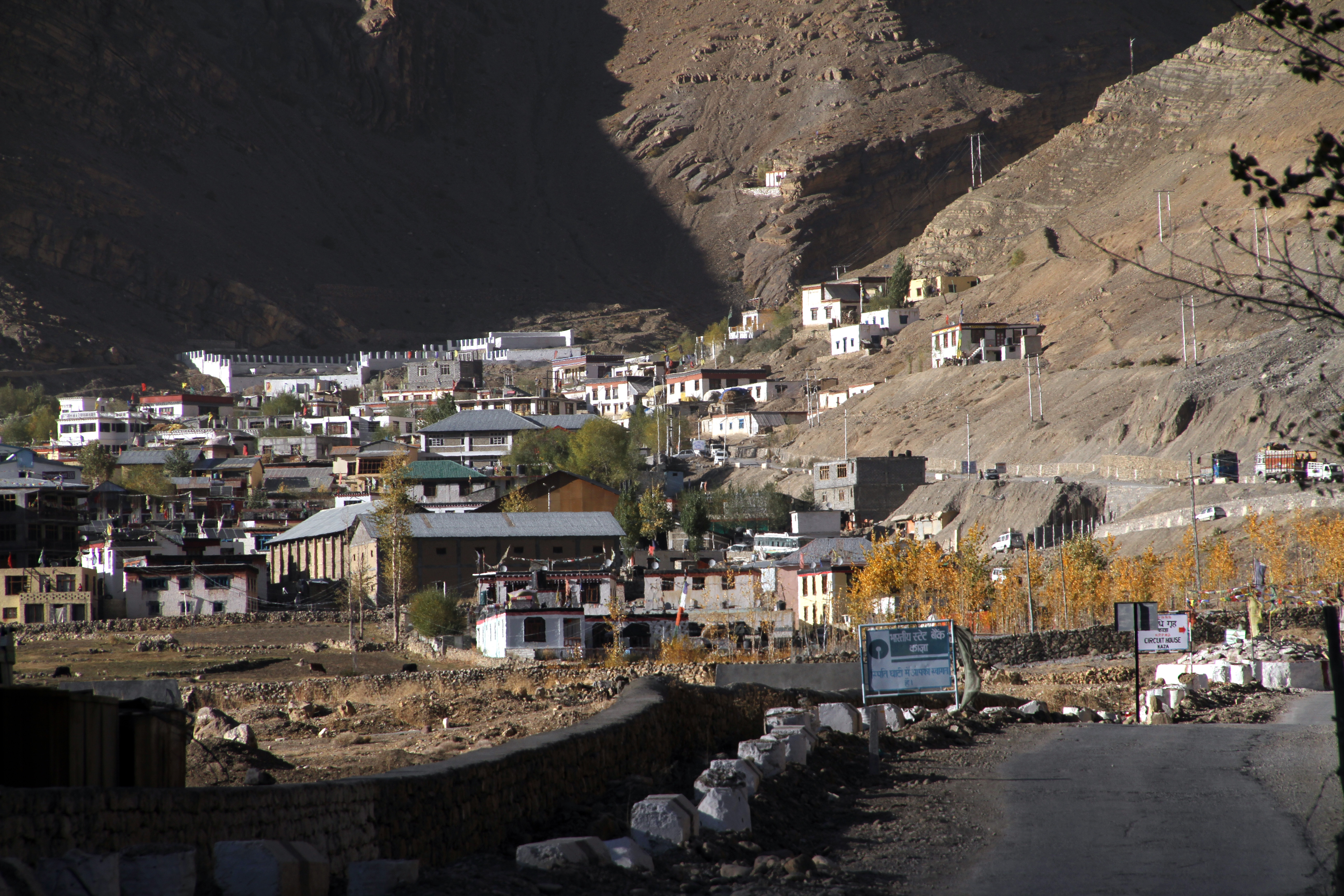
Kaza in Spiti valley

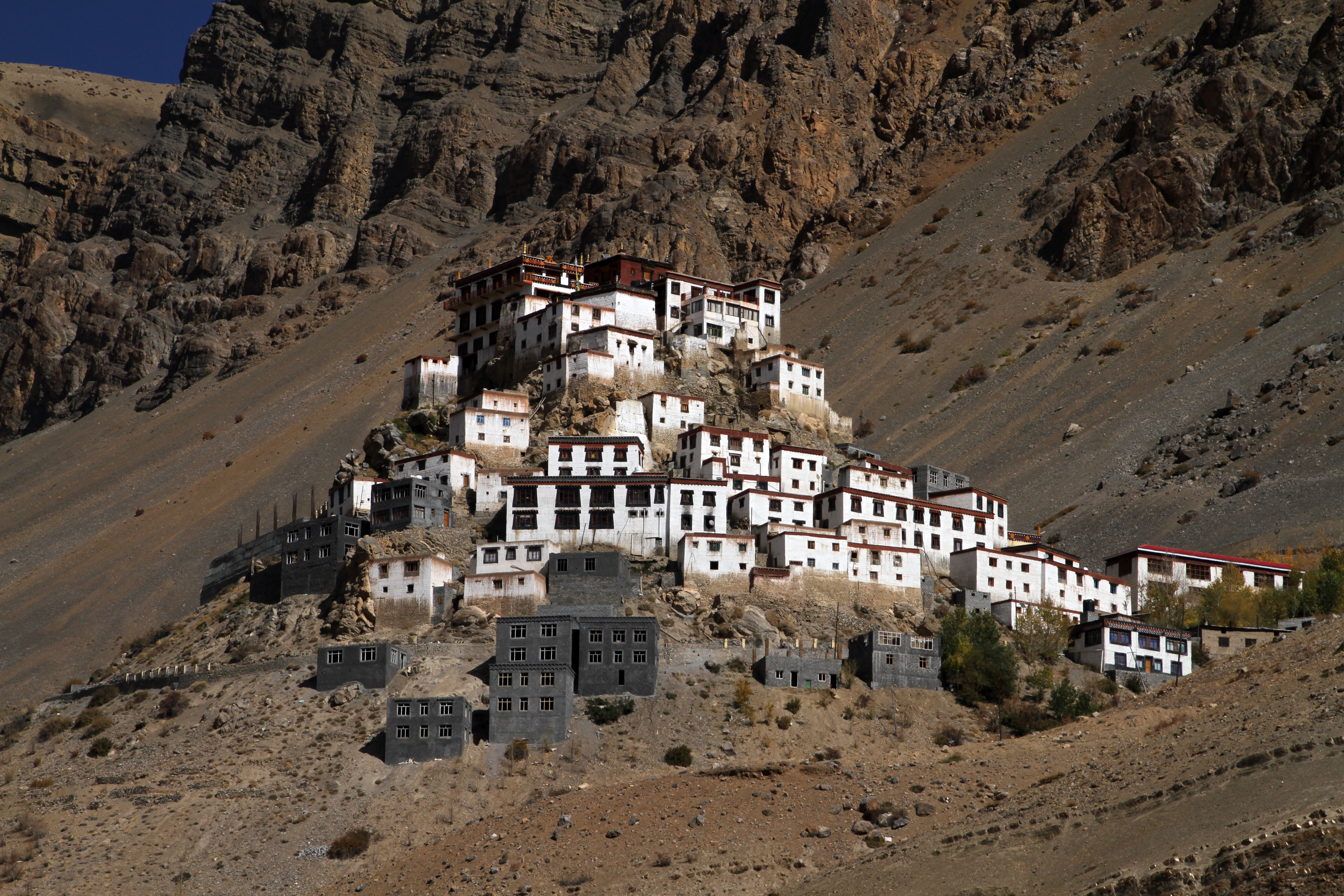
Key Monastery

After Kaza, NH 505 crosses to the right bank of the Spiti river over the Rangrik Bridge. At the bridge, the Kaza-Kibber road continues on the left bank to Key Monastery (8 km (5.0 mi)) and the Kibber Wildlife Sanctuary (15 km (9.3 mi)). NH 505 continues on the right bank running through a flat, narrow valley in which the Spiti River has carved a gorge about 300 m (980 ft) deep. The road crosses back to the left bank 3 km (1.9 mi) before Kialto village. Here, the Kaza-Kibber road rejoins NH 505, a distance of 22 km (14 mi) from Kibber. After Morang and Hanse villages, the valley broadens before Losar village.

After Losar, NH 505 turns up the right bank of the Lichu, a right bank tributary of the Spiti. The road climbs gradually up to Kunzum La, elev. 4,551 m (14,931 ft). There is a temple at the pass.

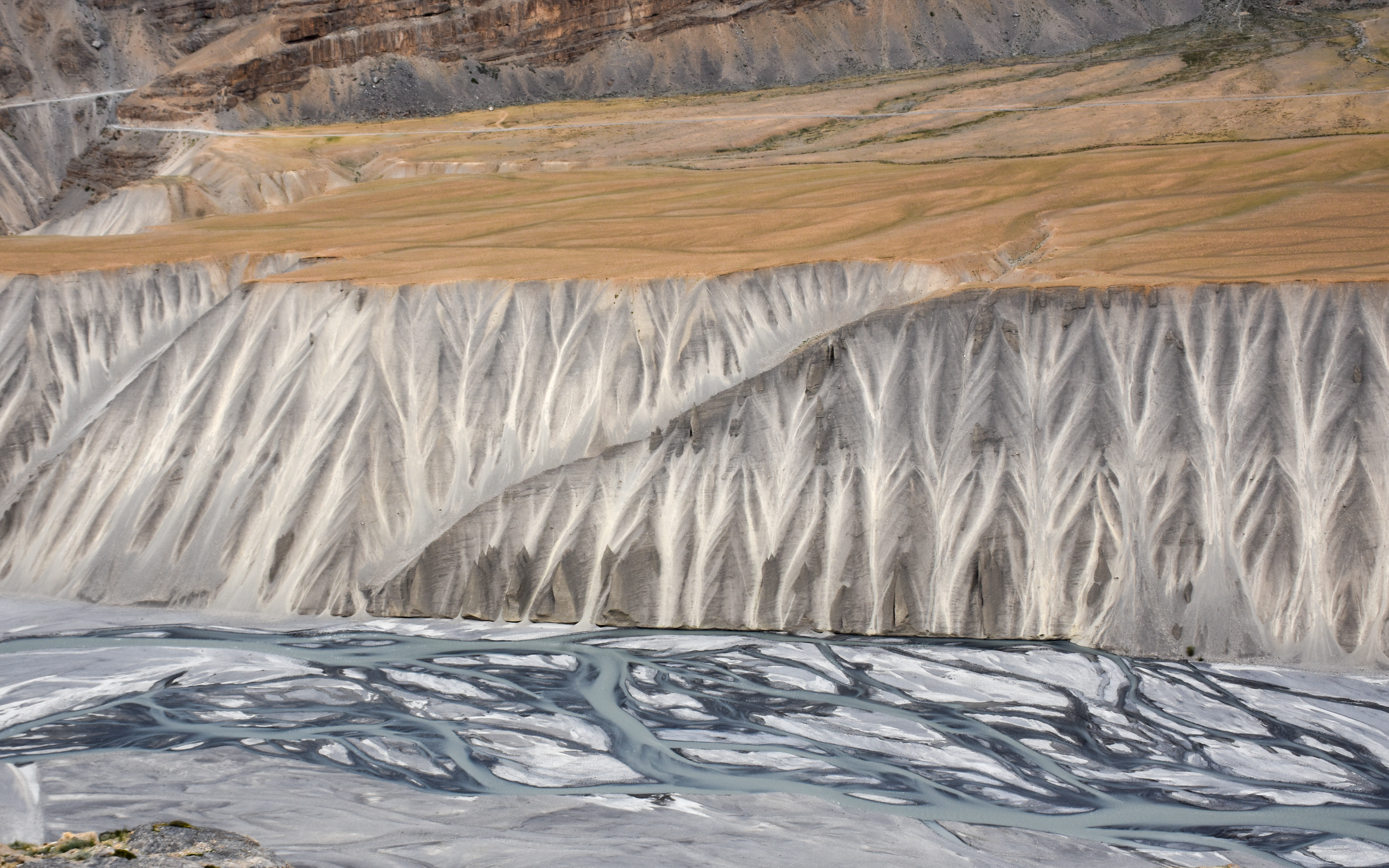
Spiti gorge above Kaza with NH 505 on the right bank (view from Kibber-Kialto road)

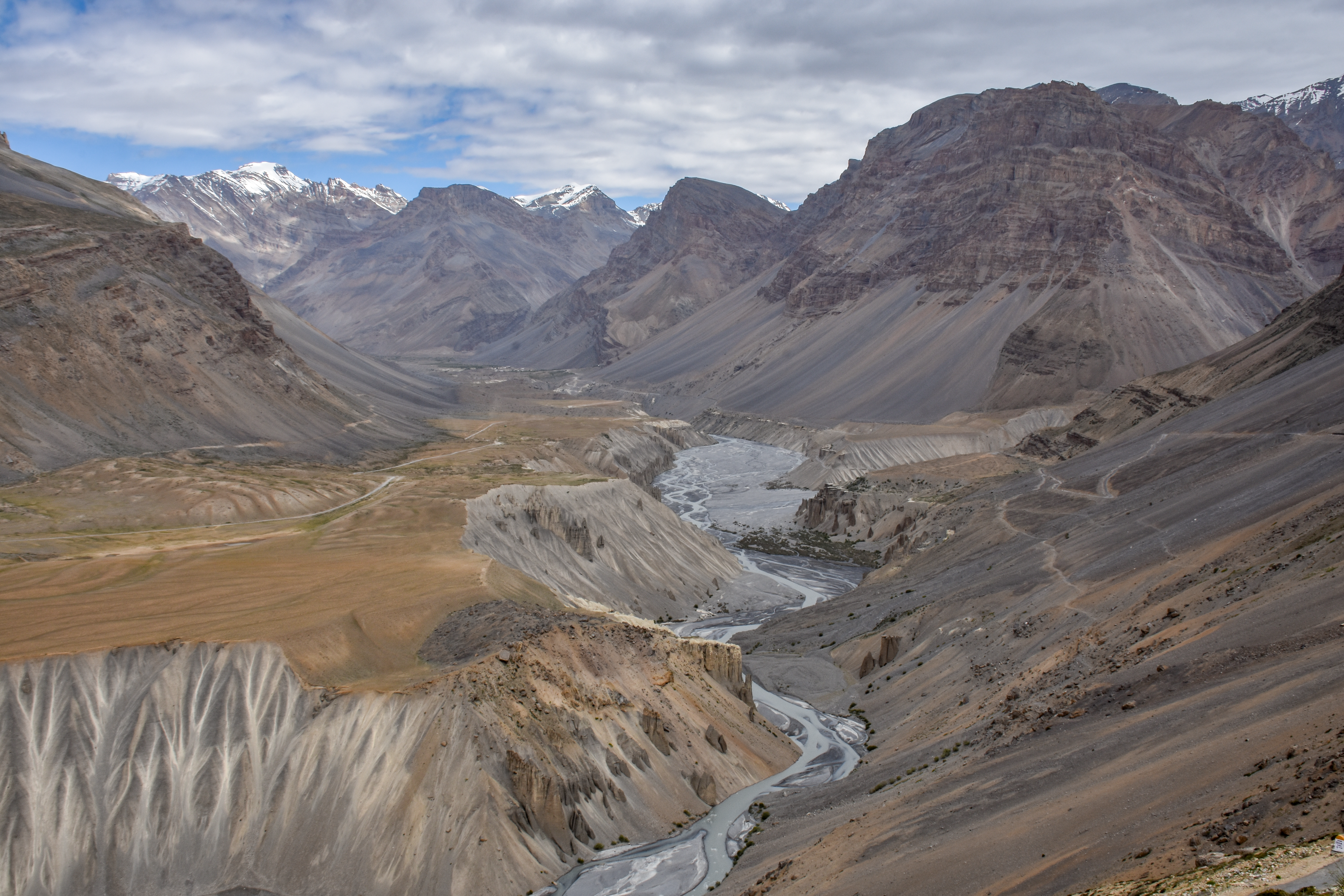
Spiti gorge with NH 505 on the right and Kibber-Kialto road on the left.

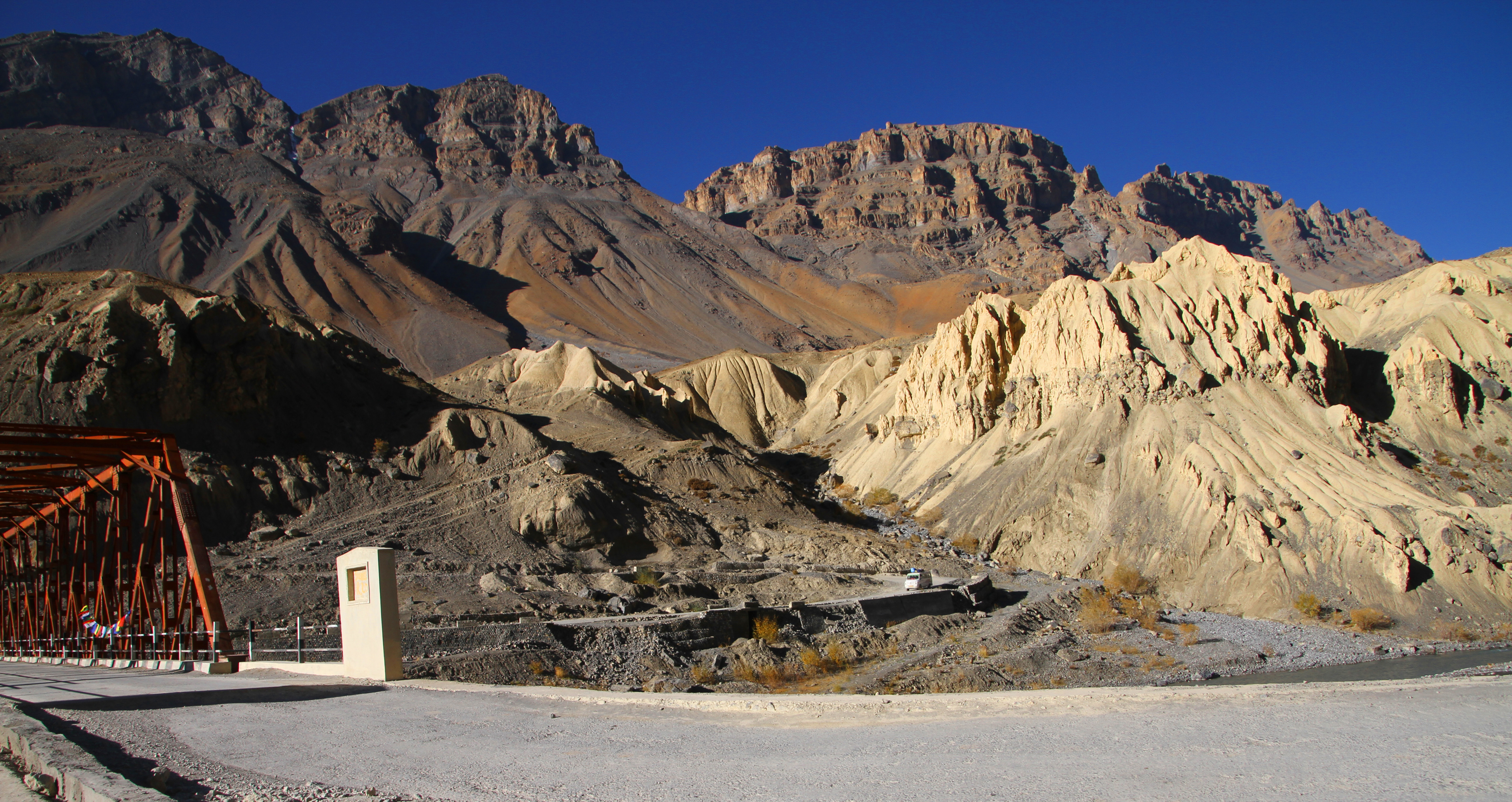
En route from Kaza to Losar

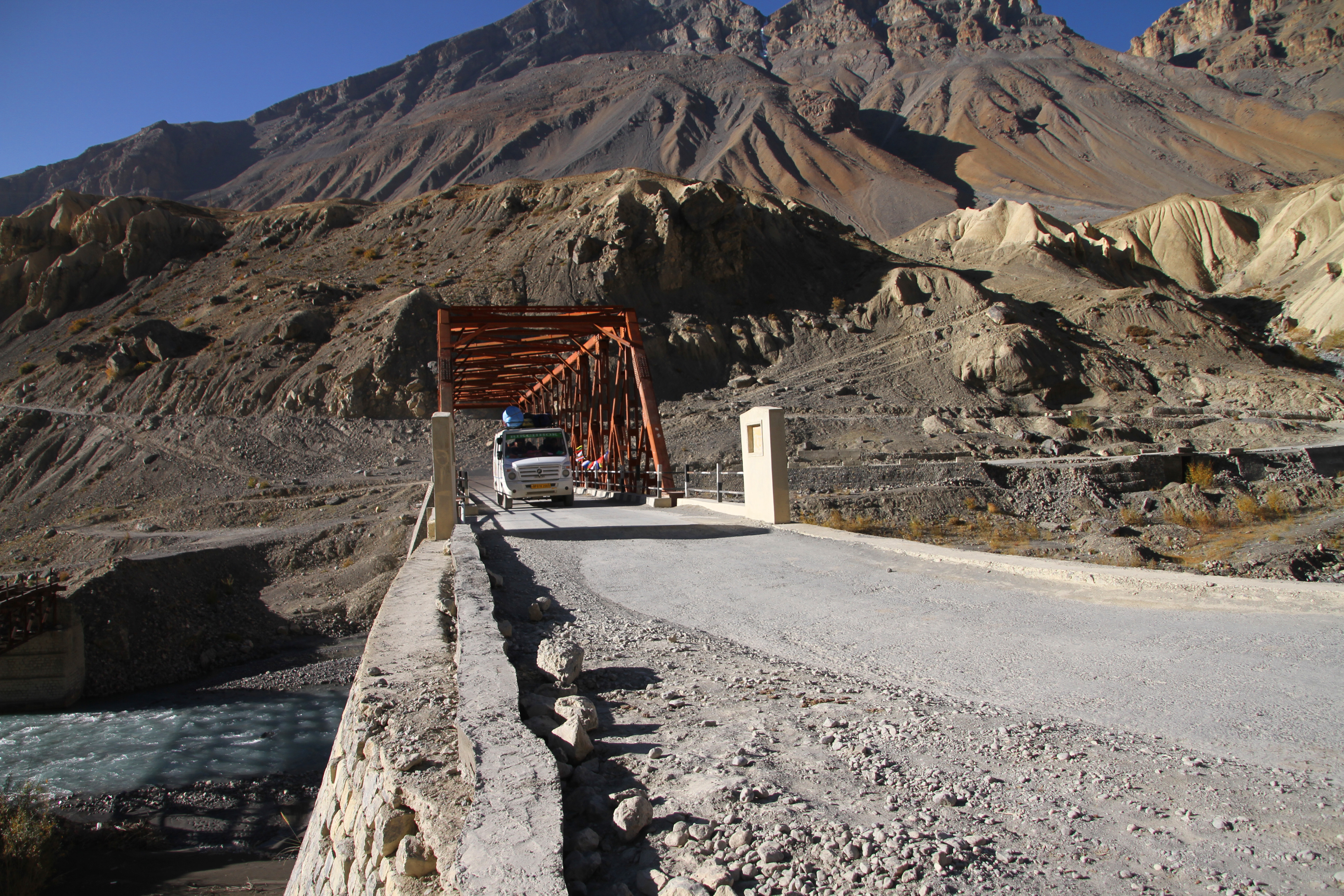
Bridge across Spiti river

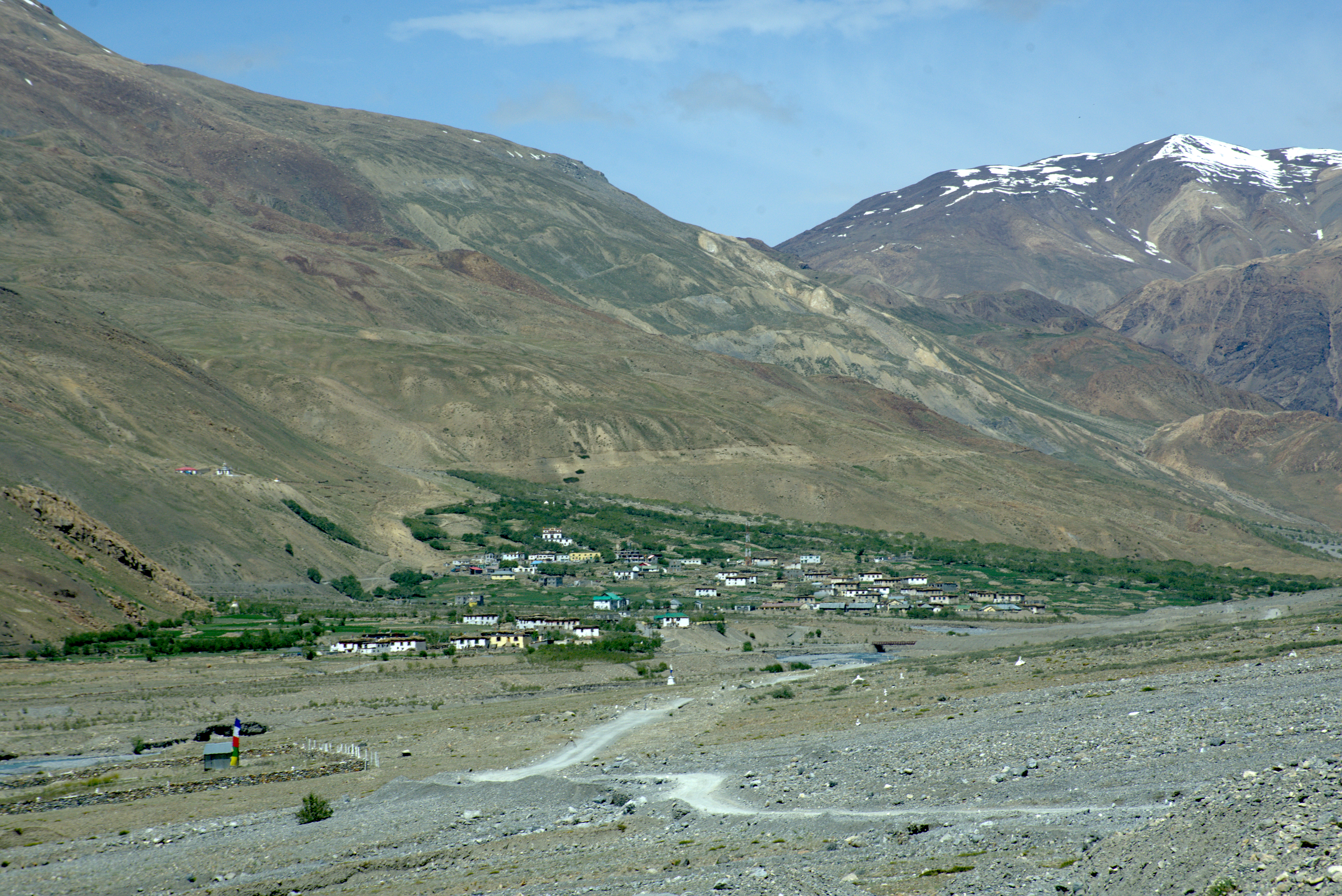
NH 505 entering Losar from the east

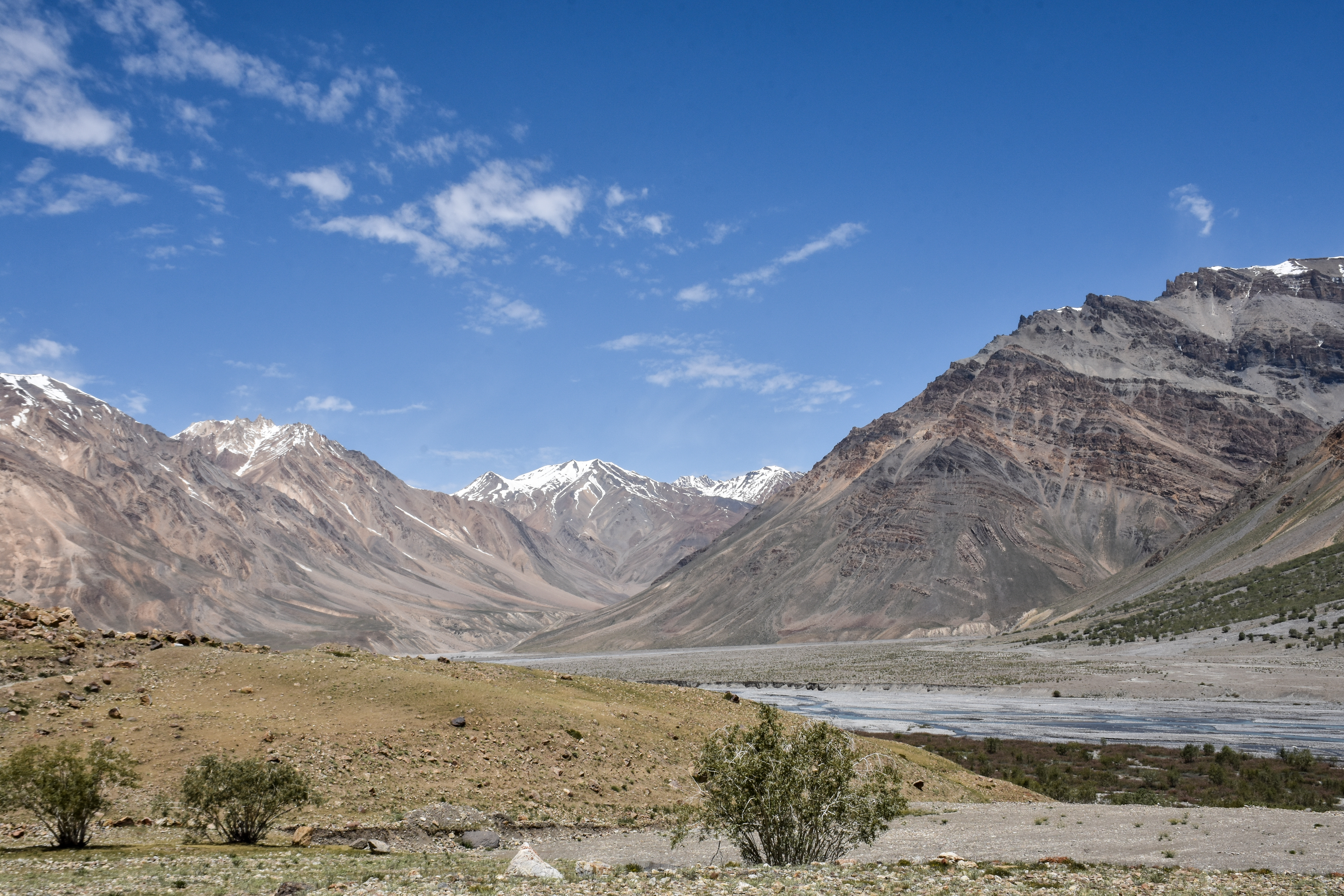
West of Losar towards Kunzum La, Elev. 4,090 metres (13,420 ft).

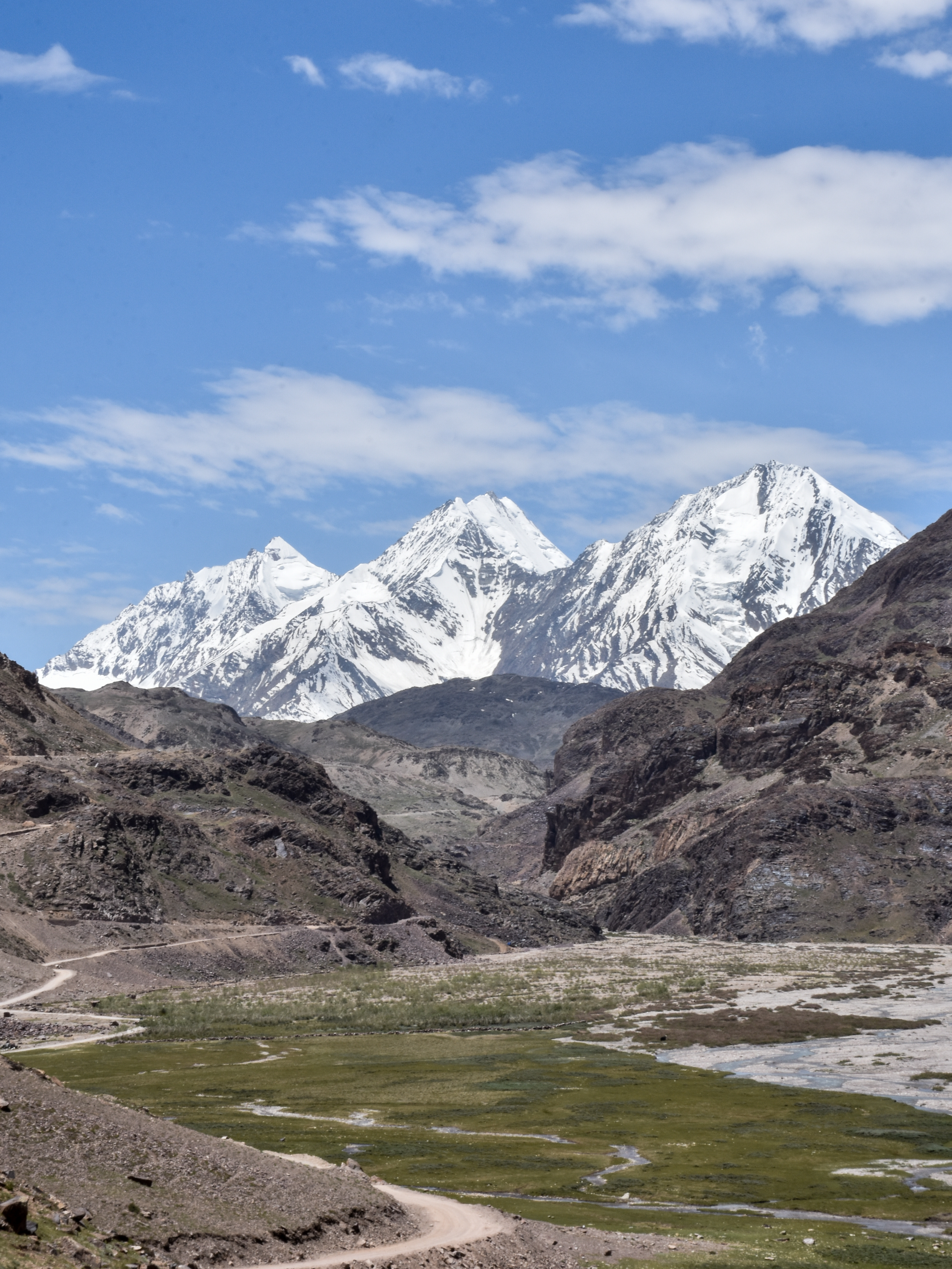
Losar-Kunzum Road

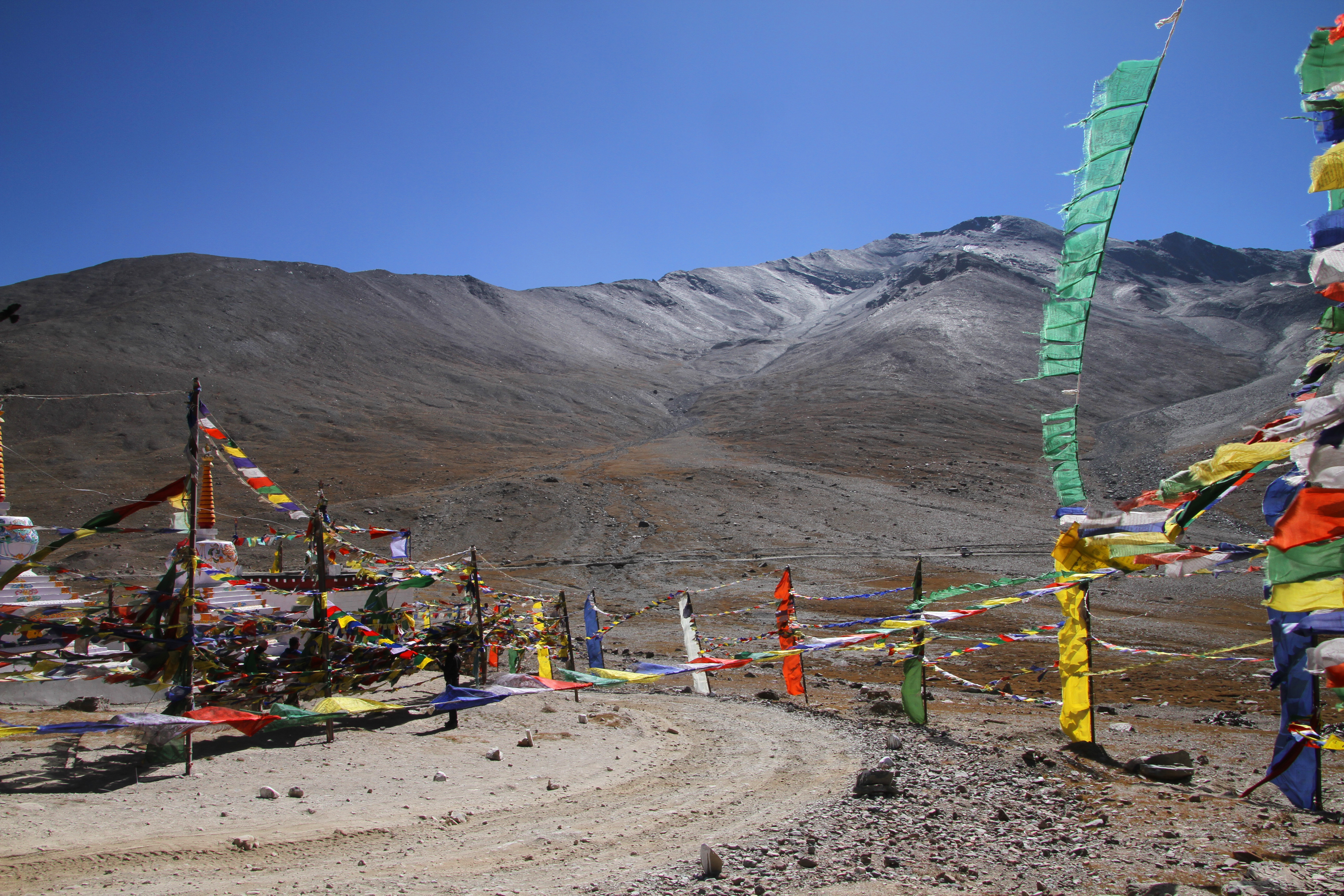
Kunzum La, Elev. 4,551 metres (14,931 ft).

From Kunzum pass, the highway descends through steep hairpin bends to Batal village on the left bank of the Chandra River. Chandra Taal is a pristine lake on the Chandra River popular with tourists and high-altitude trekkers. The road to Chandra Taal branches off from NH 505 about 2.9 kilometres (1.8 mi) from Batal and 8 km (5.0 mi) from Kunzum Pass.

From Batal, NH 505 follows the left bank of the Chandra River, practically running on the riverbed in some places, as both sides of the narrow valley are very steep. This section is largely unpaved and impassable during the winter months. Passing through Chotta Dara, the highway reaches Chhatru, where it crosses to the right bank. It climbs steeply and runs along the top of a cliff overlooking the Chandra River until the terminus at Gramphu (Gramphoo).

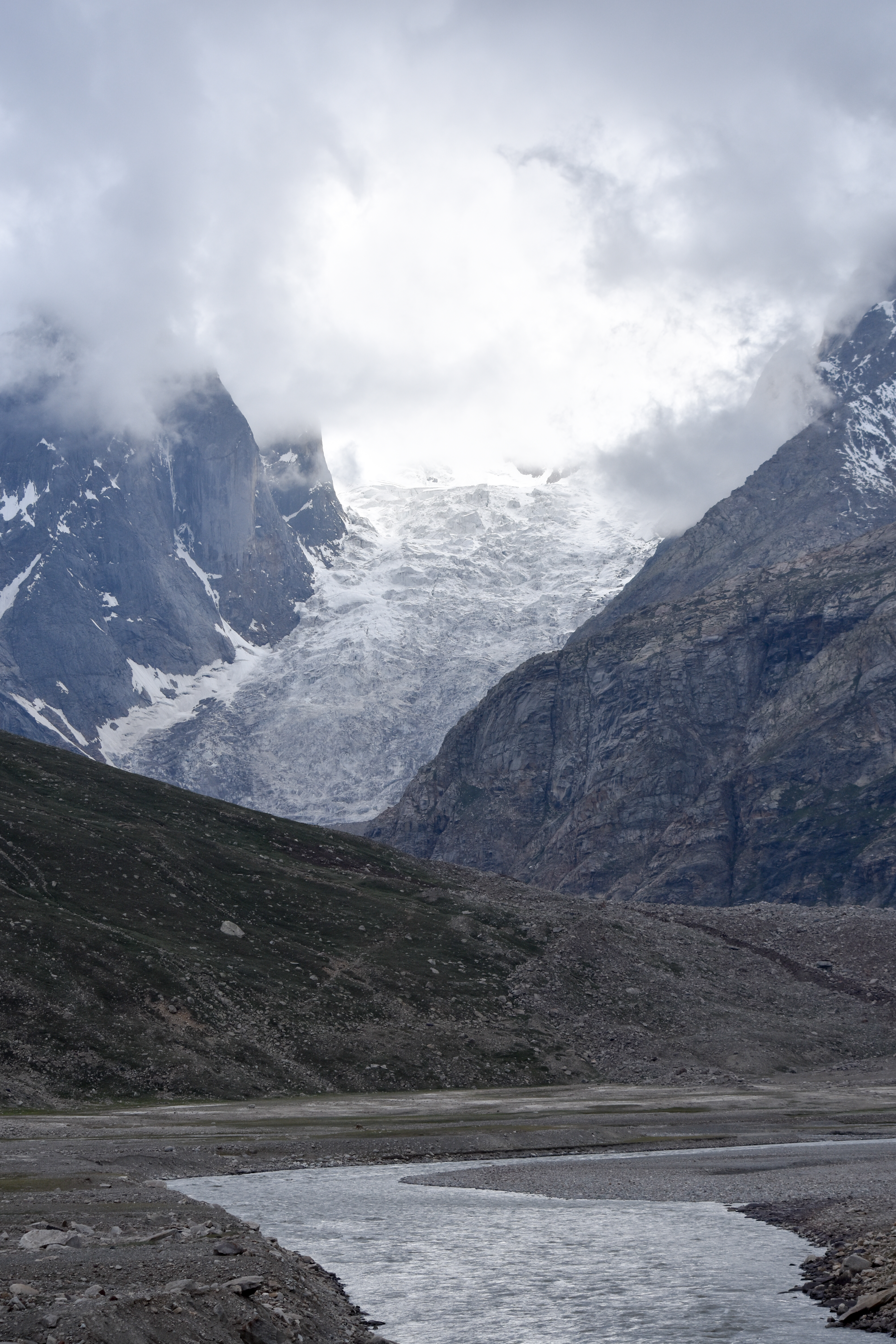
Bara Shigri Glacier on the right bank of the Chandra

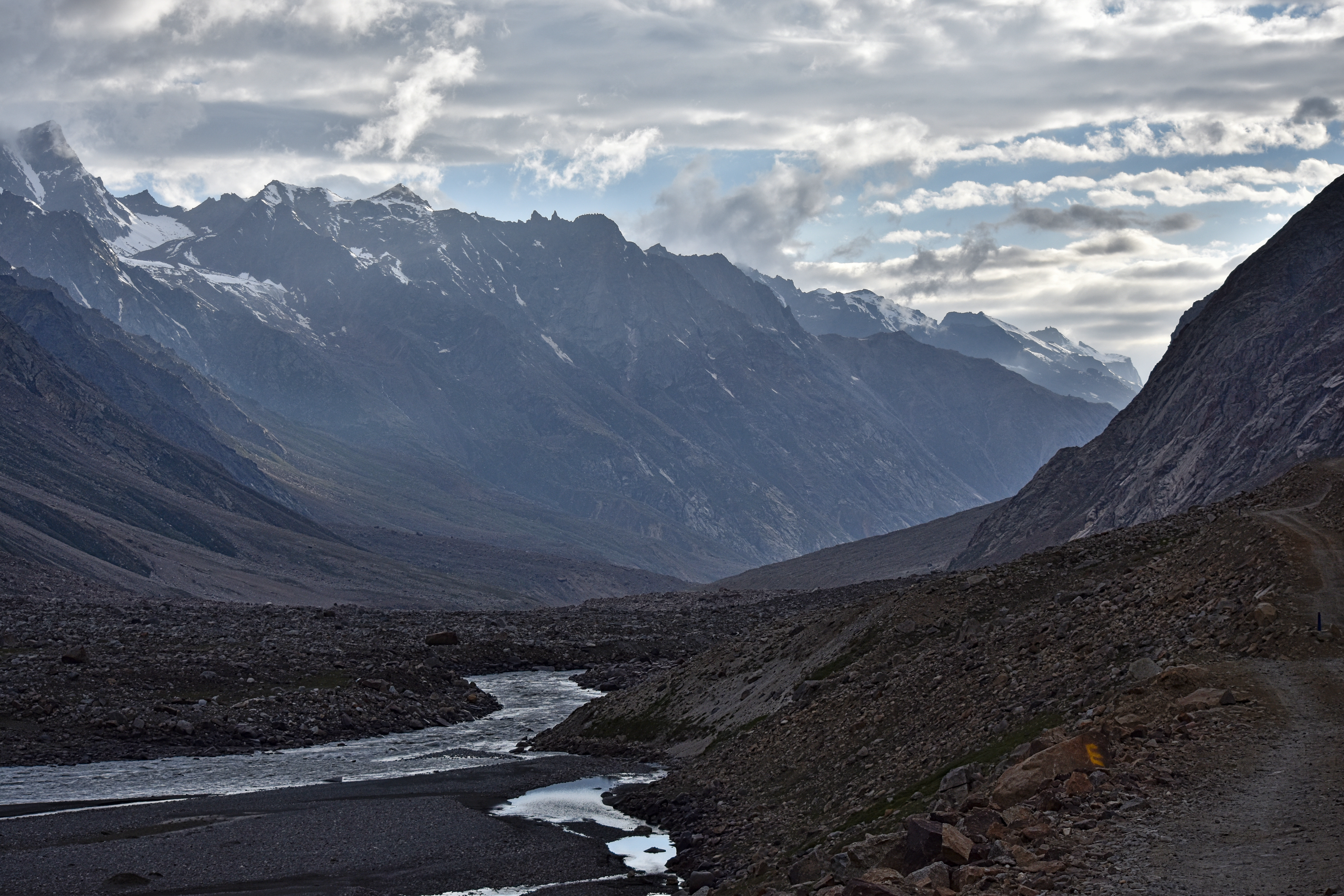
NH 505 runs along Chandra riverbed below Batal

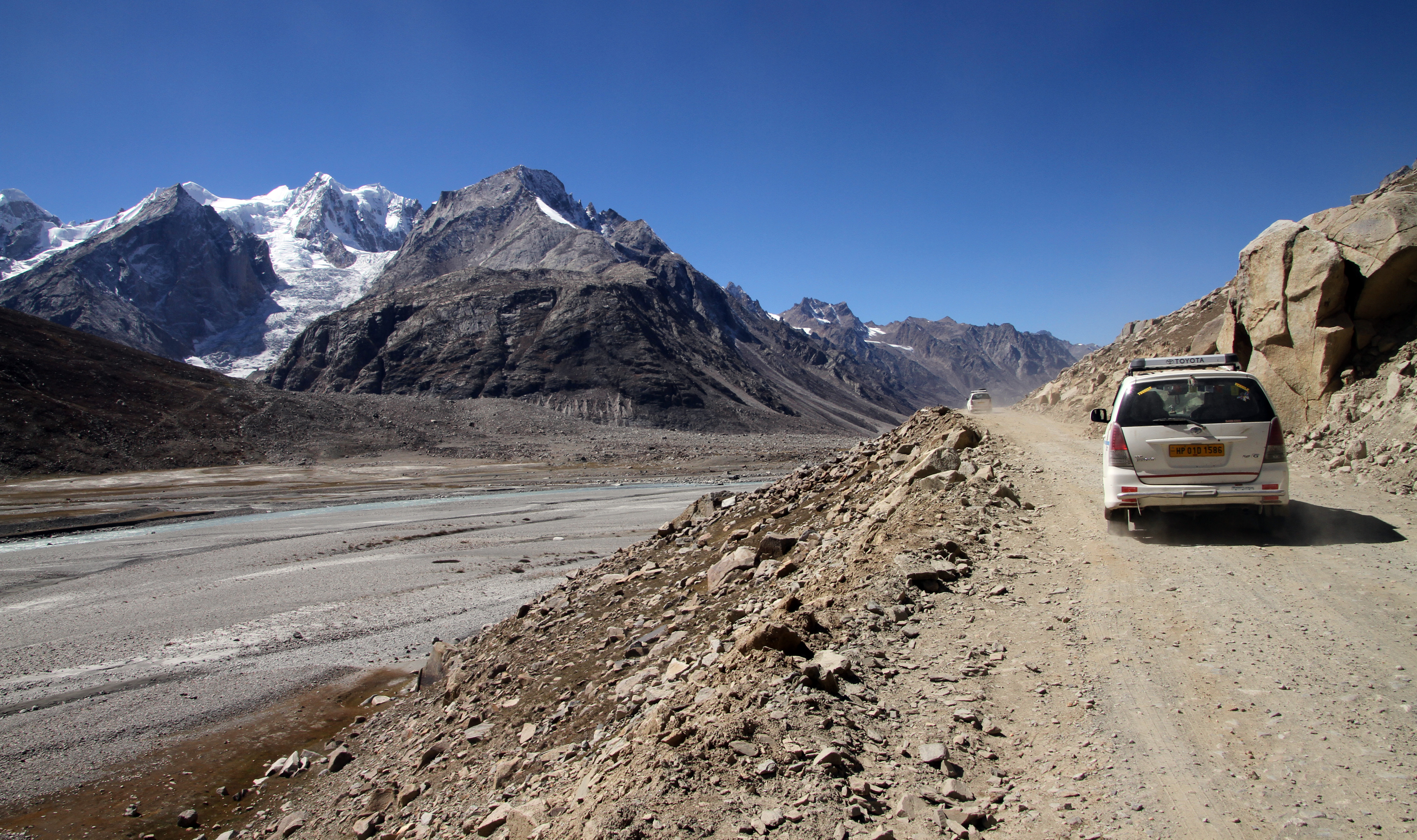
Batal to Chhatru

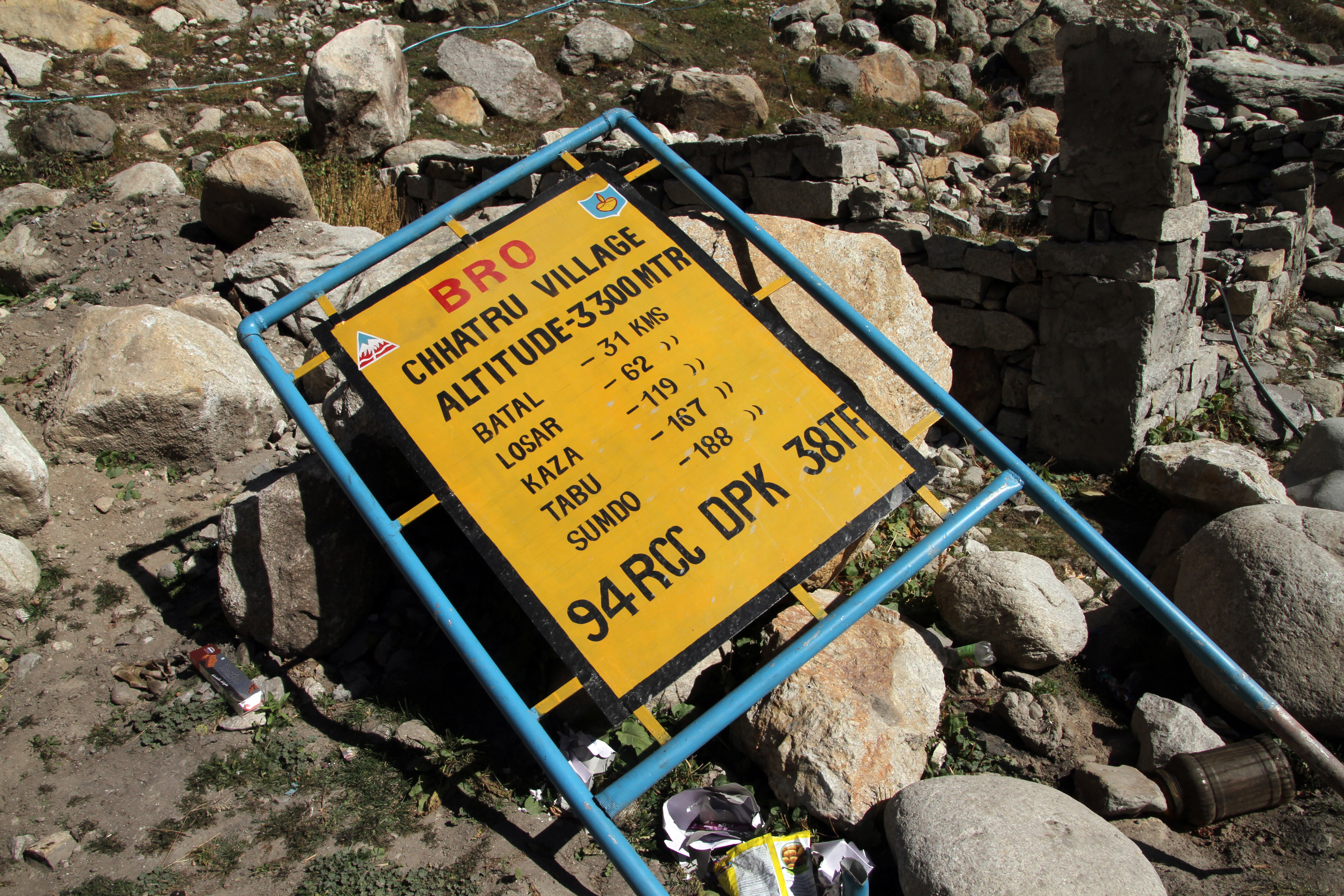
Chhatru village

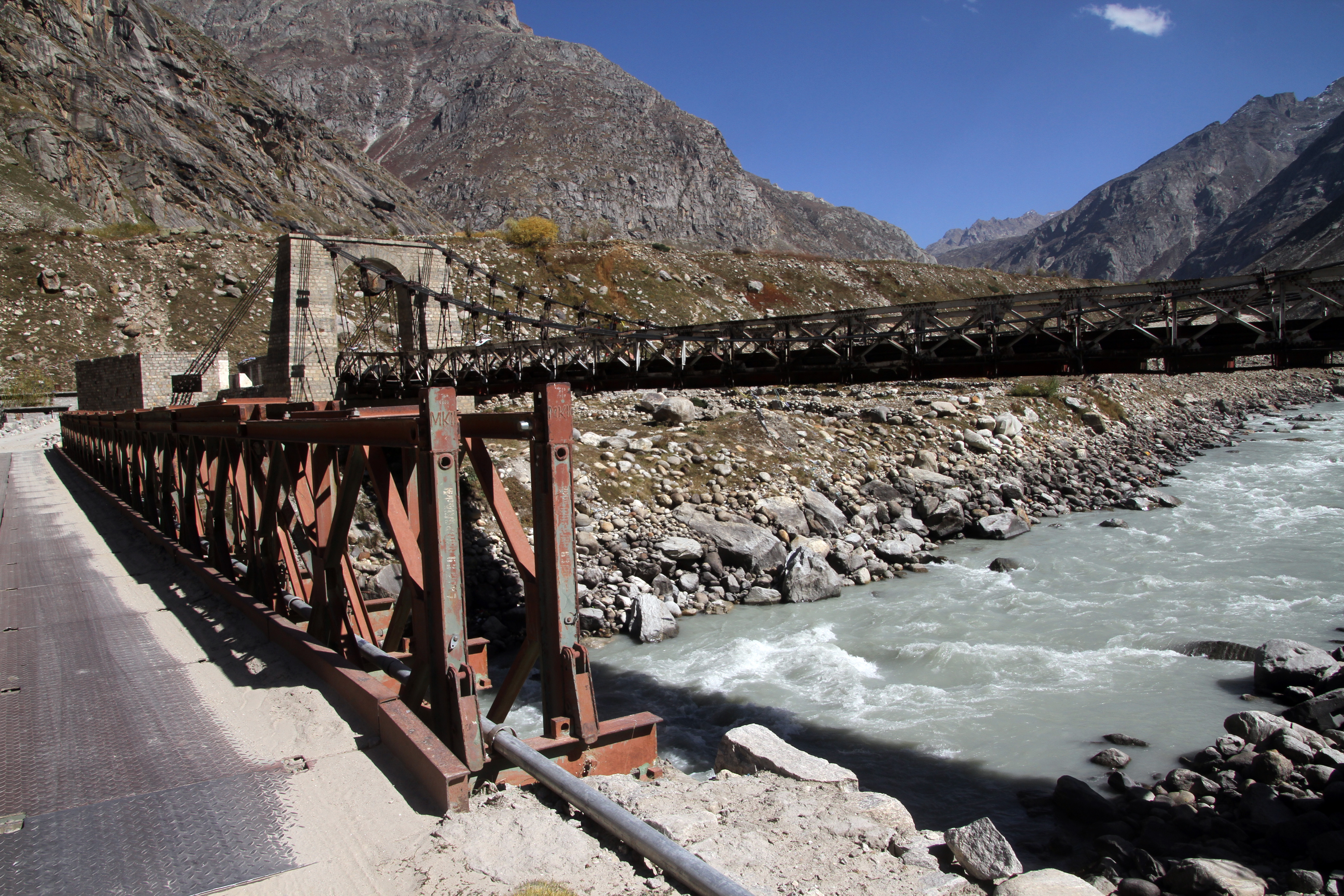
Chhatru to Gramphu

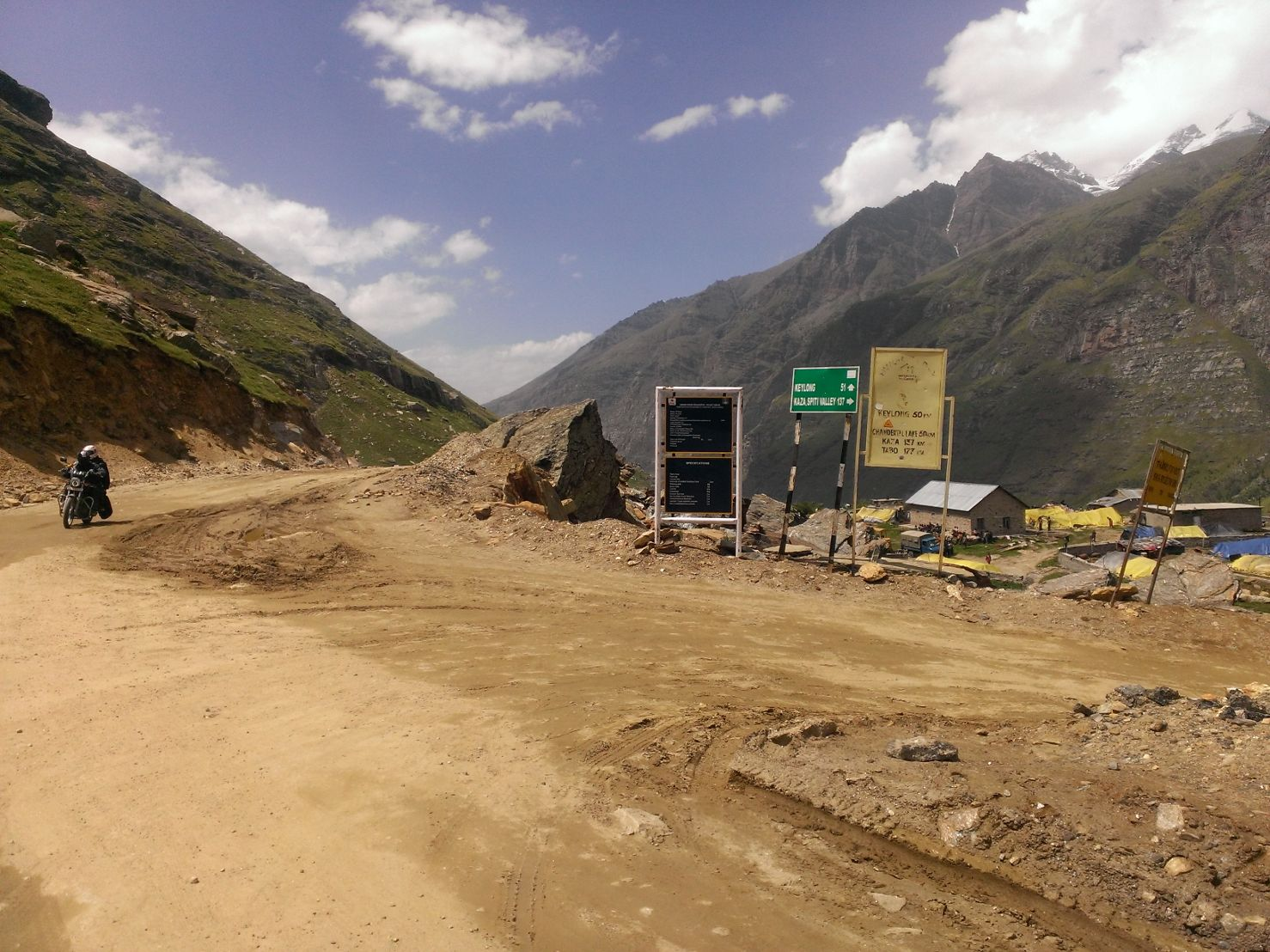
Junction with NH 3 on left at Gramphu

== Junctions ==
County	Location	mi	km	Destinations	Notes
Kinnaur district	Khab	0.0	0.0	NH 5	Southeast terminus
Lahaul and Spiti district	Attargo Bridge	74.6	120.0	Mud village, Pin Valley	About 1.8 km (1.1 mi) NW of Lingti
Lahaul and Spiti district	Gramphoo	169.6	273.0	NH 3	Northwest terminus
1.000 mi = 1.609 km; 1.000 km = 0.621 mi: Concurrency terminus

== See also ==
- List of national highways in India
- List of national highways in India by state
