= Kibber =

High-altitude village in Himachal Pradesh, India

Kibber Khyipur
- Village
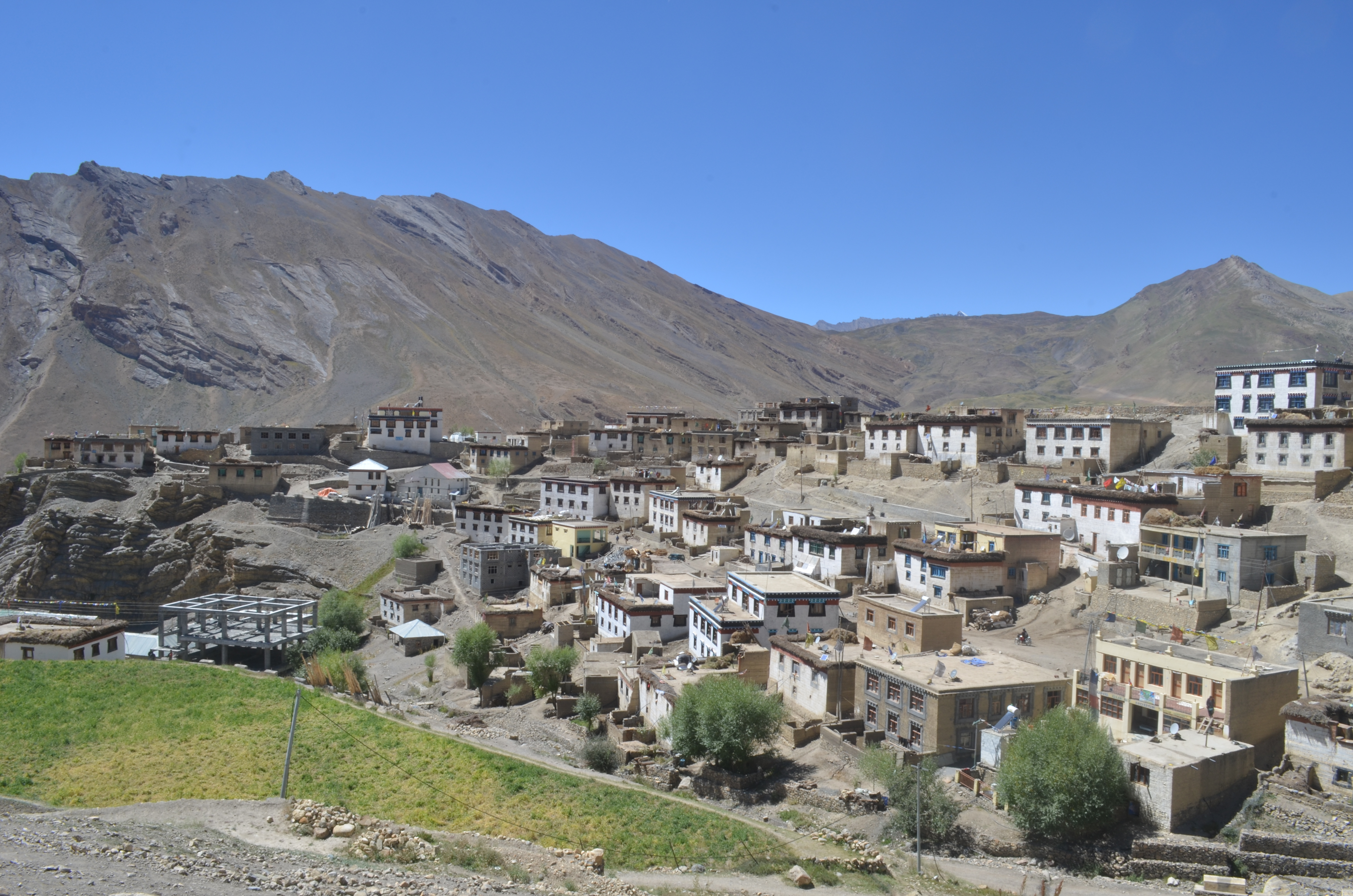
- Kibber village in summer, ca. Sep '15

- Location in Himachal Pradesh, India
- Coordinates: 32.331667°N 78.008889°E
- Country: India
- State: Himachal Pradesh
- District: Lahaul and Spiti
- Elevation: 4,270 m (14,010 ft)

Population (2011)
  - Total: 366

Languages
  - Official: Hindi and the indigenous languages of the Ladakhi peoples of Indo-Aryan and Tibetan descent.
- Time zone: UTC+5:30 (IST)
- Postal code: 172114
- Vehicle registration: HP-41
- Climate: Dfc

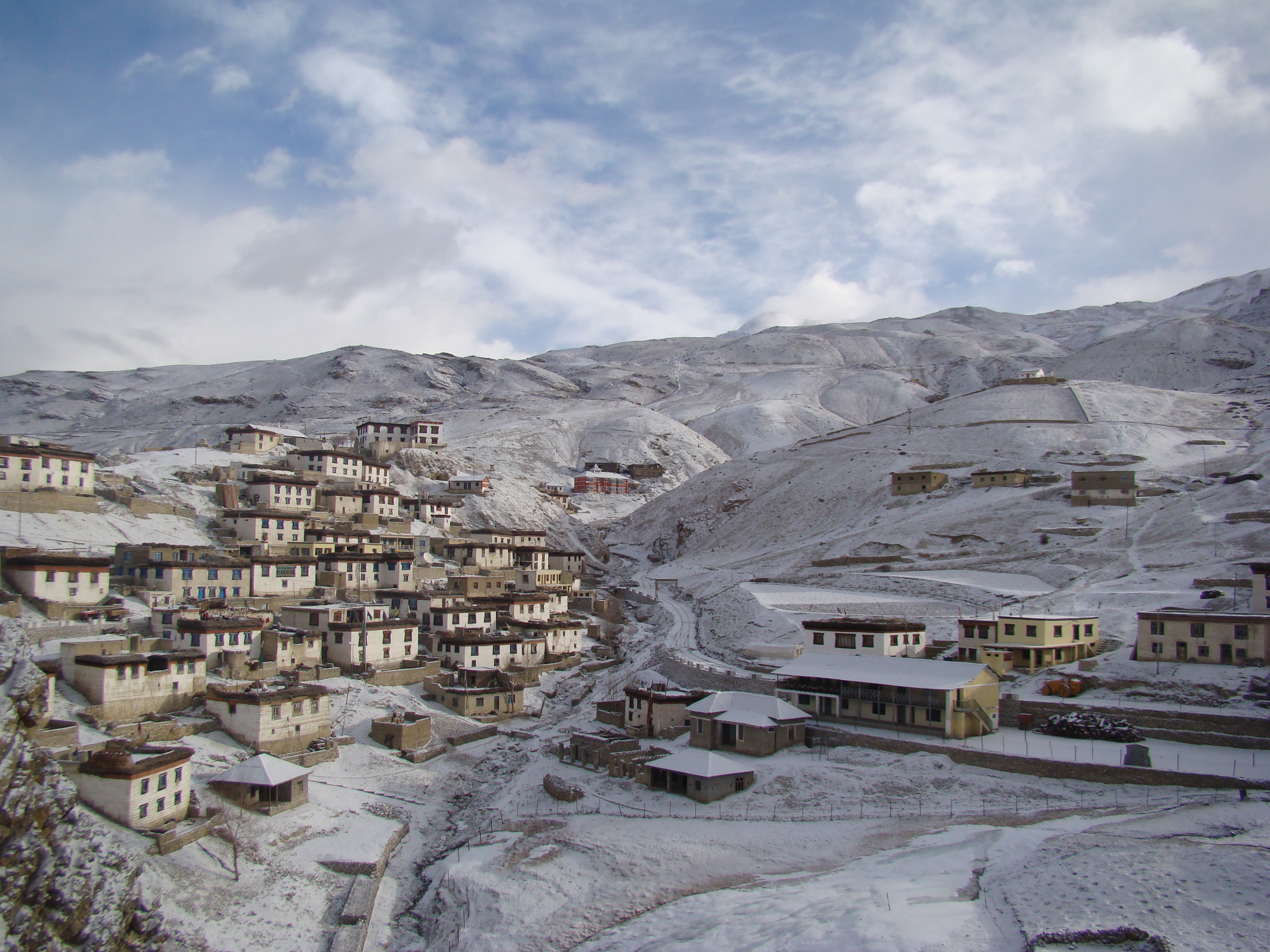
Kibber Village in winter (ca. Dec '07)

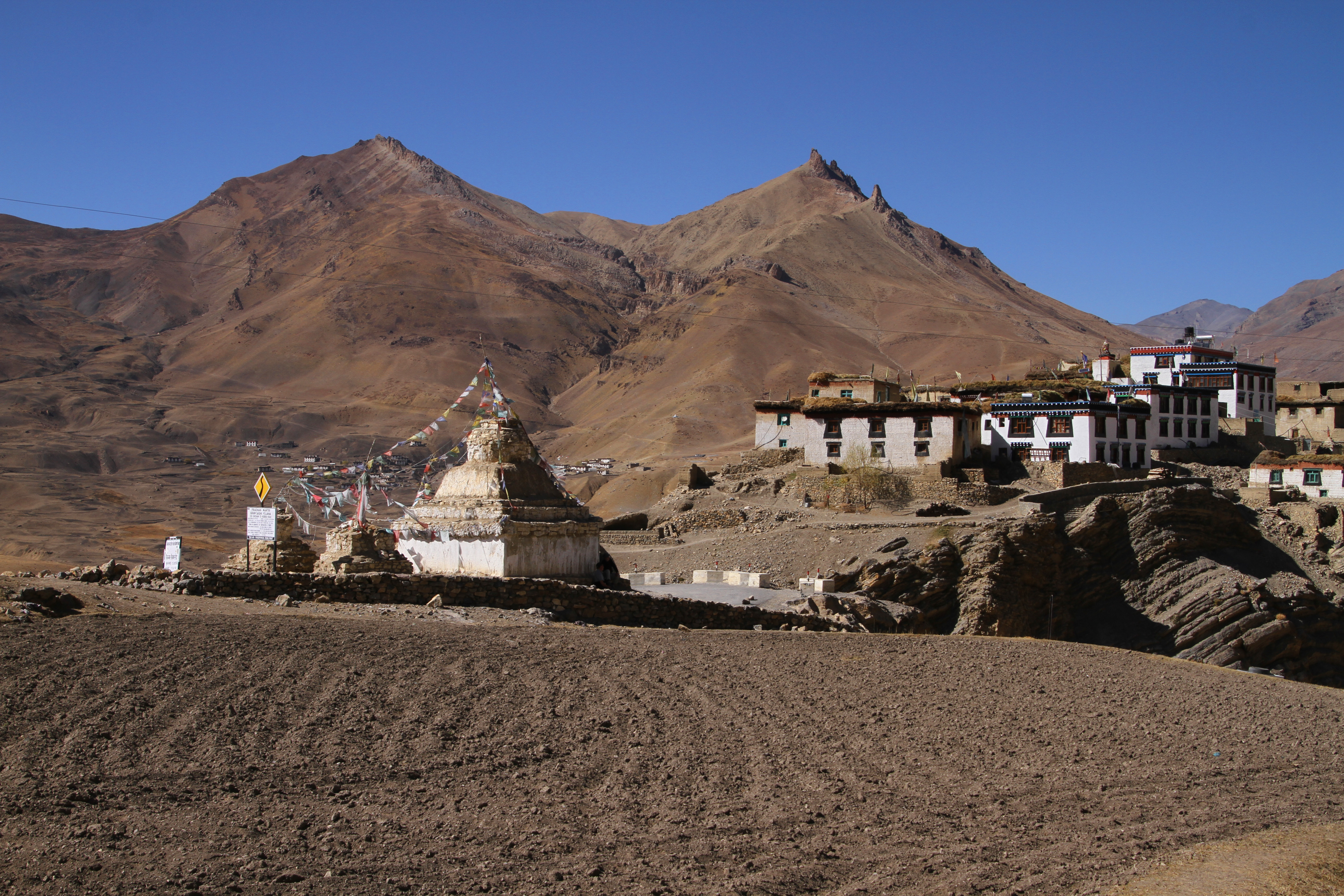
Kibber Gompa

Kibber, also Kibber Khas and Khyipur, is a village high in the Spiti Valley in the Himalayas at 4,270 m (14,010 ft) in Himachal Pradesh in northern India. It contains a monastery and is a base for visiting the Kibber Wildlife Sanctuary, home to about 30 snow leopards. It is located 19 km (12 mi) from Kaza and a bus service connects them in the summer months. Agriculture forms the backbone of the local economy and lush green fields are abundant. Treks to nearby peaks and to a high pass in the Zanskar range between Spiti and Ladakh start from Kibber.

== History ==
Kibber is the last village in Spiti on the traditional trade route to Ladakh and Tibet. One of the earliest descriptions is by botanist Thomson based on his expedition in September 1847. The route crosses the Zanskar range through the Parang La (pass) at an altitude of 5,578 m (18,301 ft). It then descends along the Pare Chu (river) to Hanle and the Indus River. Thomson observed that houses in Kibber were constructed of stone, unlike the mud construction used in the rest of Spiti. He noted that farmers had terraced the hillside for 90 m (300 ft) above Kibber.

In earlier times, annual trade fairs were held in Kibber and other locations in Spiti. Traders would come from Tibet, Ladakh, Chamba and Kullu to barter their wares. With the closing of the Indo-Tibet border, these fairs have lost their historical purpose.

== Geography ==
Kibber Khas is located on a limestone cliff on the left bank of the Spiti River. With an area of 465.2 ha (1,150 acres) in an arid cold desert at 4,270 m (14,010 ft), Kibber is about 620 m (2,030 ft) higher than Kaza. It is 19 km (12 mi) from the sub-divisional headquarters Kaza. After passing the Kye Monastery, the road from Kaza climbs steeply up a narrow gorge on the left bank of the Puri Lungpa, a tributary of the Spiti, to reach Kibber. It is one of the highest villages in the world that is inhabited year round.

The terrain slopes gently upwards from Kibber towards the northeast until the towering Zanskar Range. The streams in the area have cut deep gorges in the limestone strata. Mountain ranges on all sides provide some protection, and water from the streams is useful for irrigation. Farmers in Kibber are able to grow crops during the summer.

== Demography ==
Kibber Khas is a small village located in Spiti sub-division of Lahul and Spiti district, Himachal Pradesh, with a total of 77 families residing there. The Kibber Khas village has a population of 366 individuals, of which 187 are males and 179 are females as per Population Census 2011.

In Kibber Khas village, the population of children ages 0-6 is 36, which makes up 9.84% of the total population of village. The average Sex Ratio of Kibber Khas village is 957, which is lower than the Himachal Pradesh state average of 972. Child Sex Ratio for the Kibber Khas as per census is 565, lower than the Himachal Pradesh average of 909. Kibber Khas village has a lower literacy rate compared to the rest of Himachal Pradesh. In 2011, the literacy rate of Kibber Khas village was 72.73% compared to 82.80% in the rest of Himachal Pradesh. In Kibber Khas, male literacy stood at 82.93% while female literacy rate was 62.65%.

Kibber has a civil dispensary, a high school, a post office, a telegraph office and a community TV set.

== Administration ==
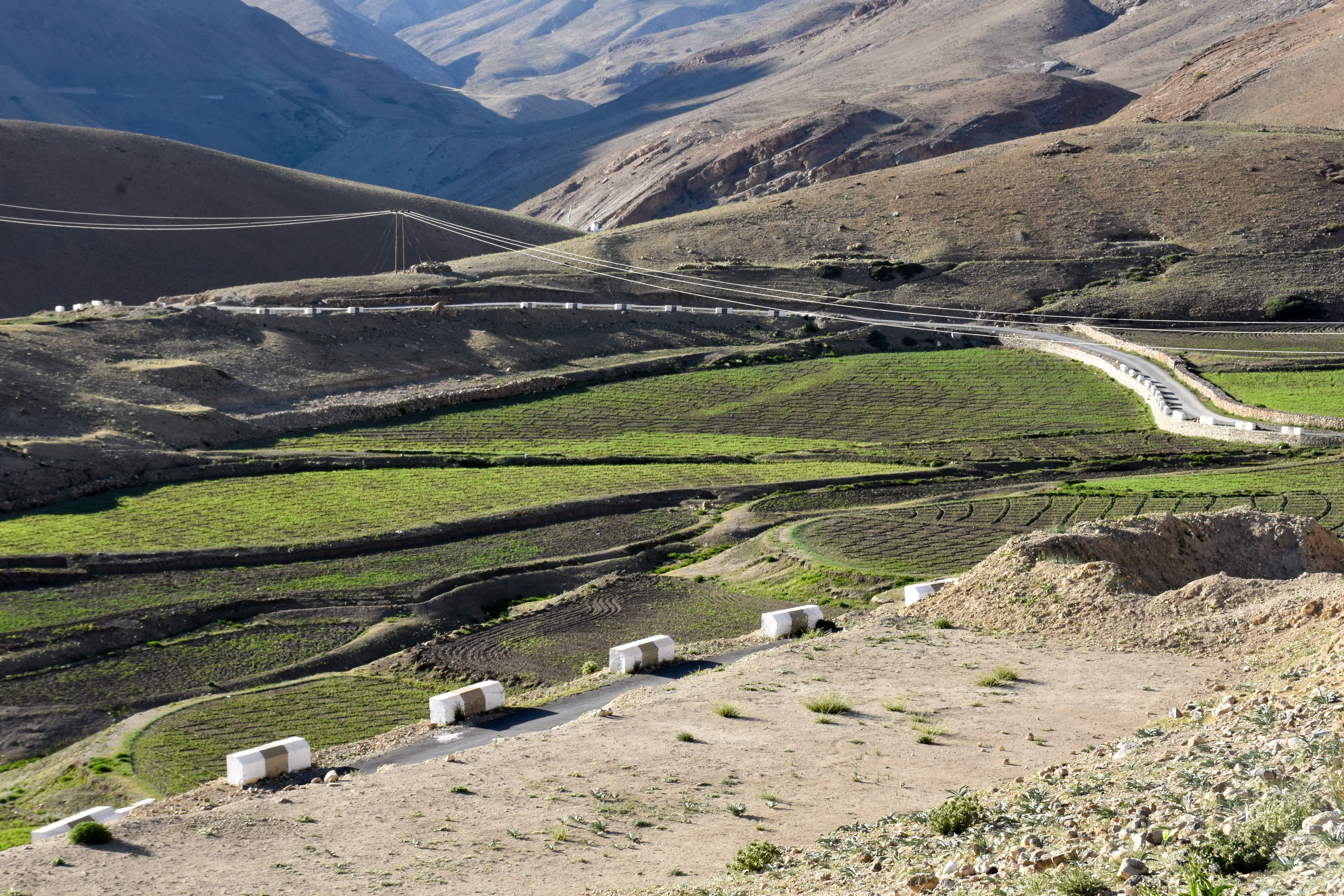
Barley and peas fields (ca. Jun '18)

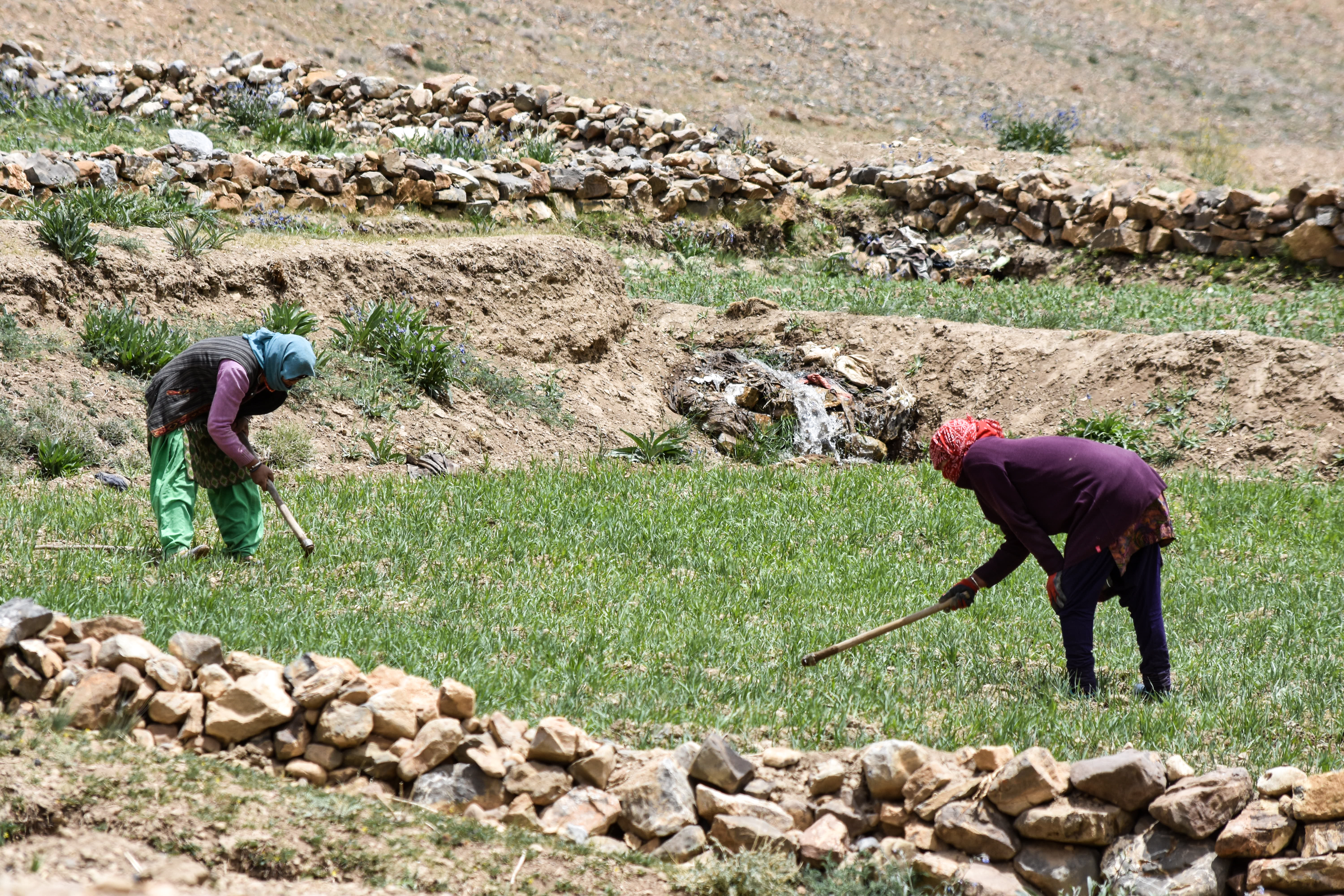
Women hoeing barley field (ca. Jun '18)

The Gram Panchayat of Kibber or Kibber Gram Panchayat is a government office and local self-government body that governs the villages of Kibber Khas, Kee, Chicham, Gete and Tashigang. Kibber is located in the Development Block Spiti of the District Lahaul Spiti.

== Economy ==
Traditionally, agriculture has been the mainstay of the economy. As the men were often traveling on trade to Tibet, Punjab and other parts of India, the women did the agricultural work primarily for subsistence. As Kibber is the base for several treks and for visits to the Kibber Wildlife Sanctuary, tourism is now part of the economy. Several homestays have been setup, and local guide treks.

=== Agriculture ===
When botanist Thomson visited Kibber in September 1847, he found terraced and irrigated fields up to 300 ft (91 m) above the village. Barley was ready for harvest. Hugh Whistler, ornithologist, visited Kibber in July 1922 and observed barley and green peas in the fields.

In 2011, an area of 389.2 ha (962 acres) of Kibber formed pastures for grazing. This amounted to 83.7% of the 465.2 ha (1,150 acres) area of the village. Only 11.3% of the land was used for agriculture, with 85.3% of this being irrigated. Barley and pulses including black peas and green peas are the major crops. With the opening of roads, there is a shift to cash crops.

== Transport ==
- Airport:
  - Shimla Airport, the nearest airport with scheduled flights, is 436 km away in the south.
  - Rangrik Airport, the proposed airport, will be 20 km away.
- Roads:
  - NH-505: Kibber is located 19 km (12 mi) from Kaza. A bus service connects them during the summer months. Travellers coming from Manali or Lahaul on NH-505 over the Kunzum La can reach Kibber without going to Kaza. After passing Losar and Hanle, NH-505 crosses a bridge from the left bank of the Spiti River 3 km (1.9 mi) after Kialto village. Just before the bridge, a minor road continues on the left bank to reach Kibber after a distance of 23 km (14 mi).
  - Kiato-Karzok Road, 125 km long road from Kiato (near Kaza in Spiti Valley in Himachal Pradesh) through the Takling La Tunnel (5575 m) to Karzok (on shores of Tso Moriri), being constructed by the BRO as fourth alternative route to Ladakh, connects Kibber to Ladakh. This road also connects to and partially overlaps with the Hanle-Kaza-Tabo Road (HKT Road) also being constructed by the BRO under Indo-China Border Roads (ICBR) scheme.

== Tourism ==
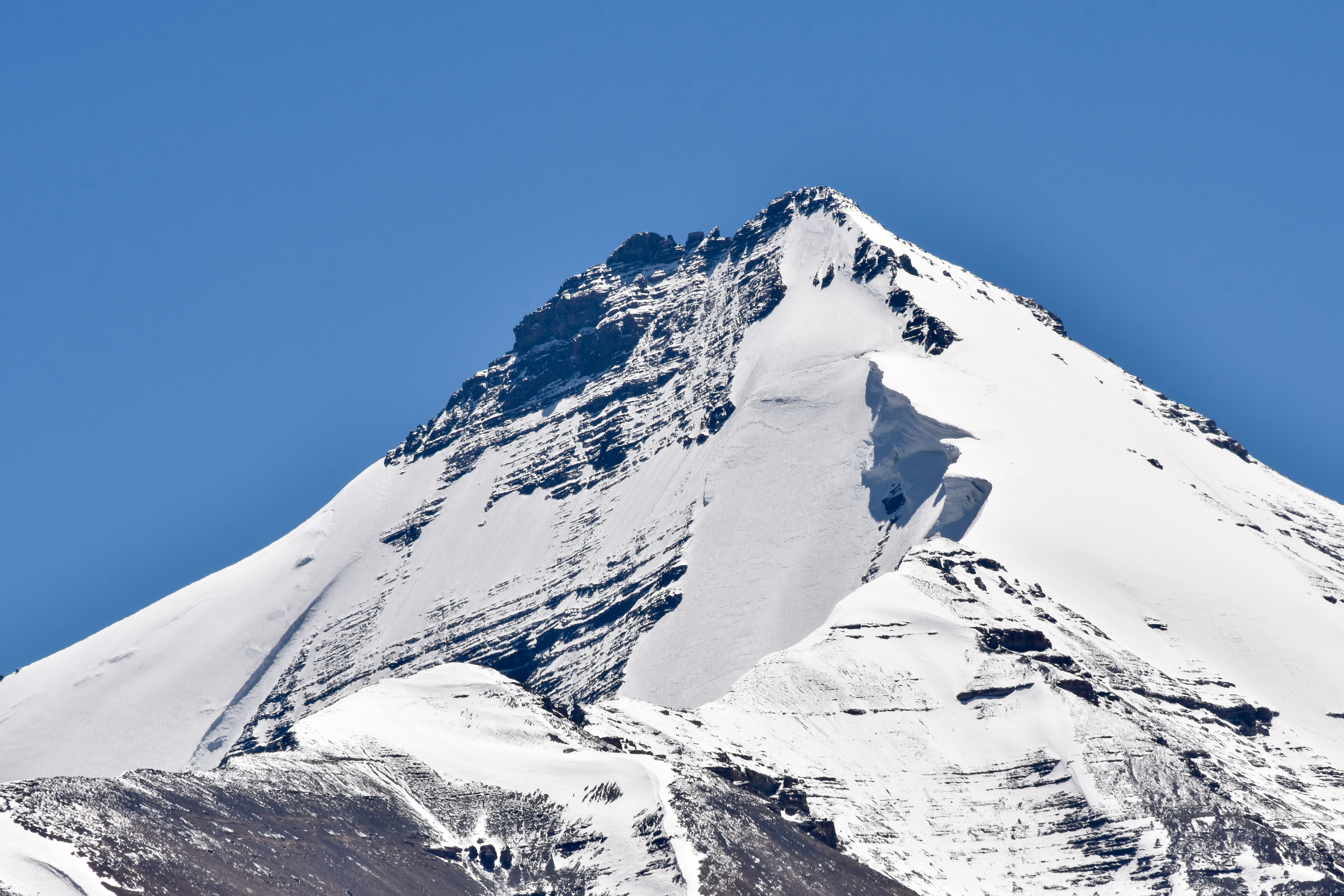
Kanamo Peak 5,998 m (19,678 ft) south face

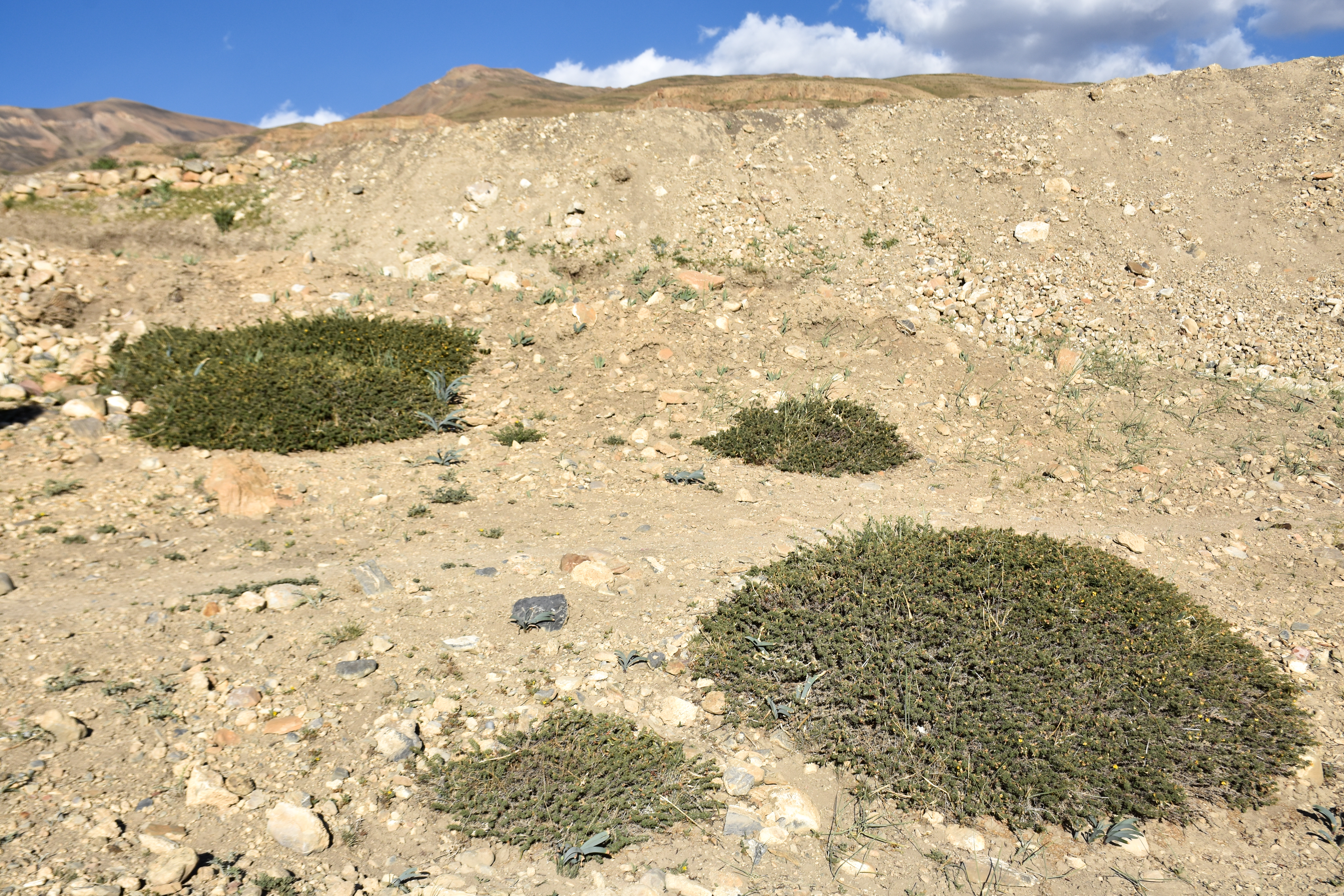
Dwarf shrub (caragana versicolor)

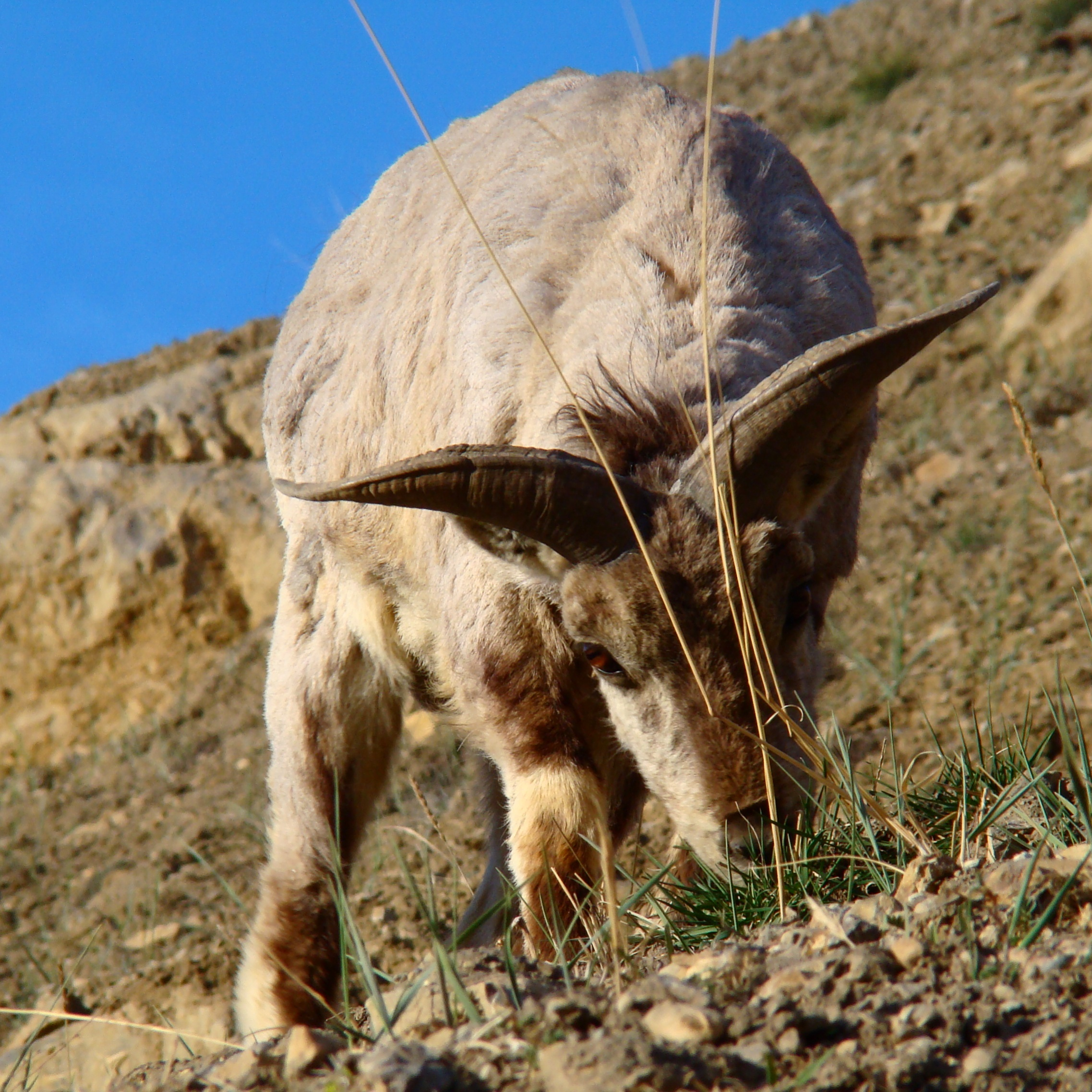
Blue sheep foraging, Kibber WLS

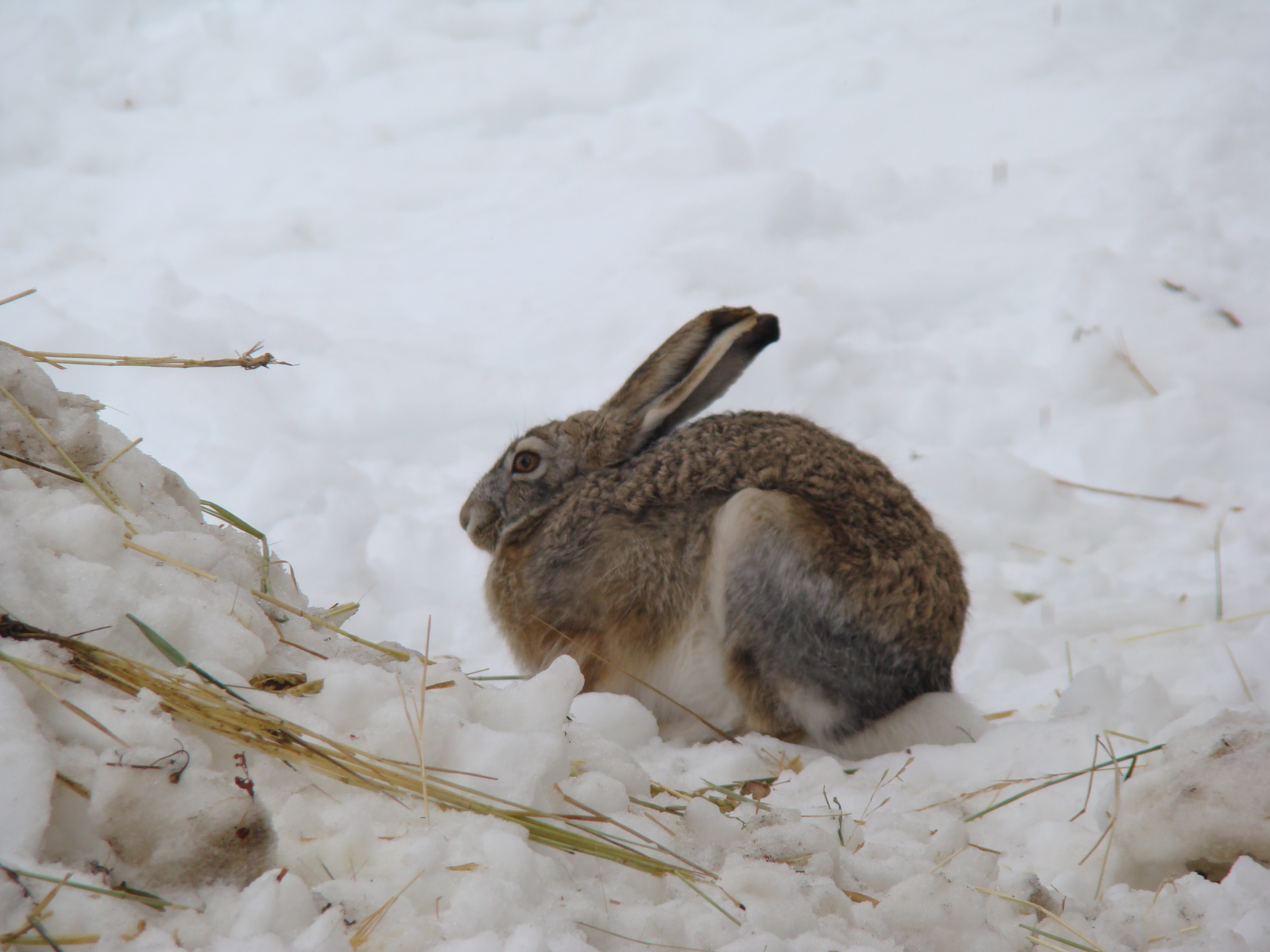
Woolly hare, Kibber WLS

== Accommodation ==
Kibber has several homestays. The nearest hotels are in Kaza.

=== Monasteries ===
Kibber has a small gompa. The well-known Kye Gompa is en route from Kaza to Kibber. The nearby village of Gete has a chorten on a cliff overlooking the Kye Gompa about 320 m (1,050 ft) below.

=== Trekking and mountaineering ===
Kibber is a base for climbing the nearby 5,998 m (19,678 ft) Kanamo Peak. The name Kanamo means either "mountain of good omen" or "white hostess (lady)". The trek is rated as an "easy ridge walk with scree on the lower slopes" by Indian mountaineer Harish Kapadia. The trek from Kibber takes 2–3 days. The season for this trek is late June to the end of September. The trail over the 5,578 m (18,301 ft) Parang La to Ladakh starts from Kibber. This strenuous trek takes about 5 days to cross the Parang La and another 5 days to descend to Karzok on the shore of Tso Moriri in Ladakh. The total distance is about 92 km (57 mi).

=== Kibber Wildlife Sanctuary ===
The Kibber Wildlife Sanctuary was established on 1st Nov 1999 with an area of 1,400 km^{2} (540 sq mi). On 7th Apr 2013, the area was increased to 2,220.12 km^{2} (857.19 sq mi). The elevation range of this sanctuary is 3,600–6,800 m (11,800–22,300 ft) above mean sea level.

==== Flora ====
The vegetation here is sparse, Kibber being well above the treeline which extends to 3,500 m (11,500 ft). The most common shrub is Caragana versicolor, a slow-growing, woody dwarf shrub with multiple stems forming a low canopy. Thomson, the English botanist who visited in 1947, observed that the plants found at these altitudes of 4,200–4,600 m (13,800–15,100 ft) were similar to those found at 3,100 m (10,200 ft) in lower parts of the Spiti valley. He attributed this to the extreme aridity of the climate and the protection afforded to the Kibber area by the lofty mountain ranges on all sides.

In a recent study, over 70 species of plants were identified in this sanctuary, compared to about 9,000 species in the whole of the Himalayas. Several plants used in the traditional Tibetan medical system, also known as Sowa-Rigpa, are found here. Eight rare and endangered medicinal plant species have been identified in this sanctuary. Aconitum rotundifolium, Arnebia euchroma, Ephedra gerardiana, Gentiana kurroo and Dactylorhiza hatagirea are some threatened but medicinally important plants found in here.

==== Mammals ====
The Kibber Wildlife Sanctuary (Kibber WLS) is home to the endangered snow leopard (Panthera uncia). The Forest Department of Himachal Pradesh reported 25-30 snow leopards in the Kibber Wildlife Sanctuary in 2018. A survey in 2021 estimated the total population of snow leopards in Himachal at about 73.

Conservation of snow leopards is a priority. The Himalayan Snow Leopard Research Centre in Kibber village was set up in collaboration with the Nature Conservation Foundation, Mysore with the goal of instituting and encouraging focused short and long-term studies. Snow leopard sighting tours are popular in winter. These result in noise and pollution of many vehicles. In 2021, the Spiti district administration banned such car rallies in Kibber and other areas favoured by snow leopards. The majority of snow leopards in Himachal were found outside protected areas, indicating that the local people are active in conservation of these big cats.

Other big animals found in the Wildlife Sanctuary are bharal (Psedois nayaur), ibex (Capra sibirica) Himalayan wolf (Canis lupus chanco) and red fox (Vulpes vulpes). The bharal and ibex are prey for snow leopards.

==== Birds ====
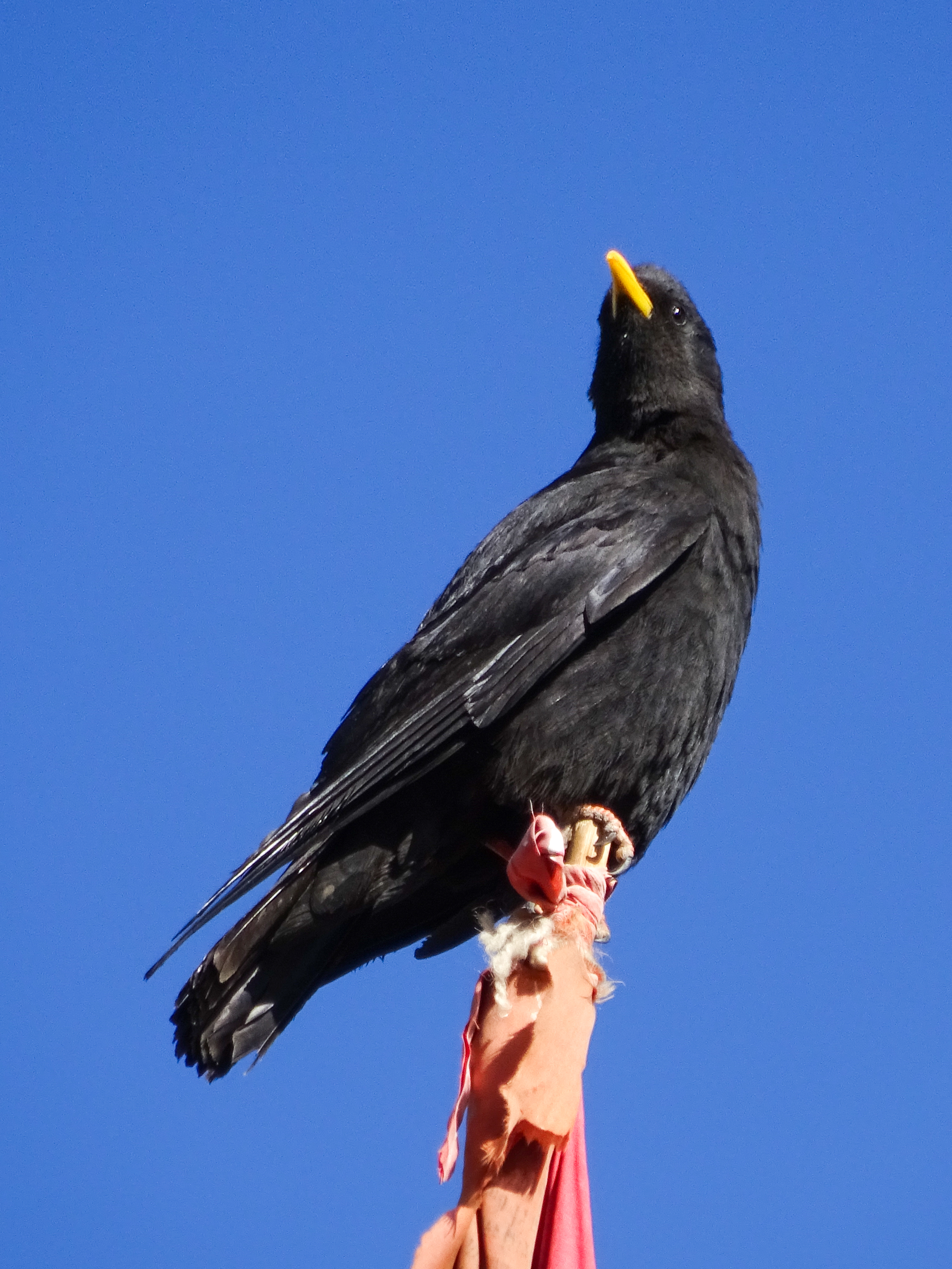
Yellow-billed chough

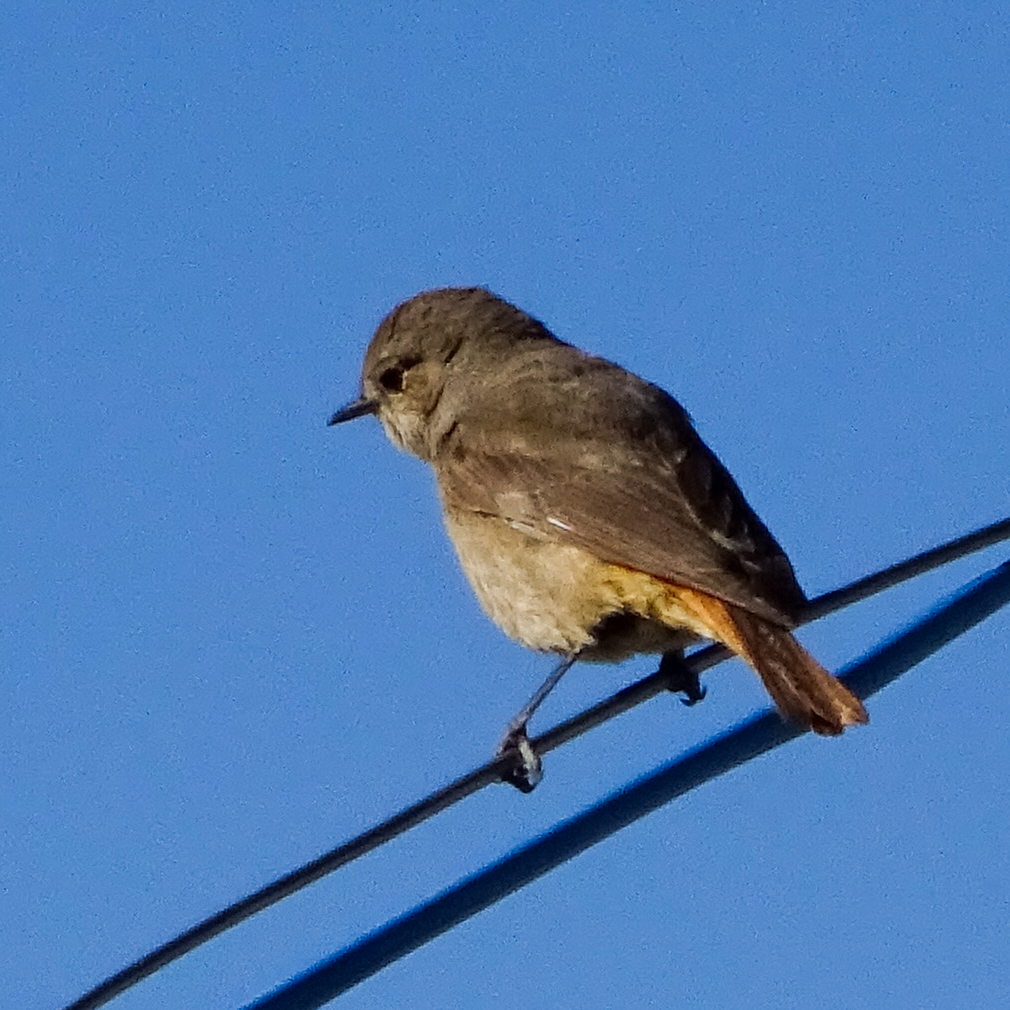
Black redstart (female)

Owing to the sparse vegetation and the extreme winters, fewer birds are found in Spiti compared to the lower Himalayas and the plains of India. In July 1922, the English police officer and ornithologist Hugh Whistler made a short trip from Lahaul down the upper Spiti River. He reached Kibber (Kibar) and Kye Monastery before turning back. During his trip, he collected over 30 species of birds. Of these, about 20 were from Kibber and the area above (now the Kibber WLS). Species collected by Whistler around Kibber included a number of songbirds: several rosefinches, mountain finches and snow finches, redstarts, larks, wrens, house sparrows and martins. Larger birds included a kestrel, lammergeier and ruddy shelducks. Snow pigeons, snow cocks and a griffon were found above Kibber from 4,575–5,185 m (15,010–17,011 ft). Alpine choughs were common.

Most of the species reported by Whistler were also observed by the American zoologist Walter Koelz during his trip down the Spiti river in September 1933. Koelz did not explore the Kibber locality, though.

The eBird.org website, used by birding enthusiasts to record sightings, lists 64 species sighted in Kibber village over the past several years. The most frequently seen species: yellow-billed or alpine chough and red-billed chough; snow finches, mountain finches; house sparrow and russet sparrow; black redstart and white-capped redstart; snow pigeon and hill pigeon; horned lark; Himalayan griffon. Most of the species observed 100 years ago by Whistler are in these eBird checklists.

== Gallery ==
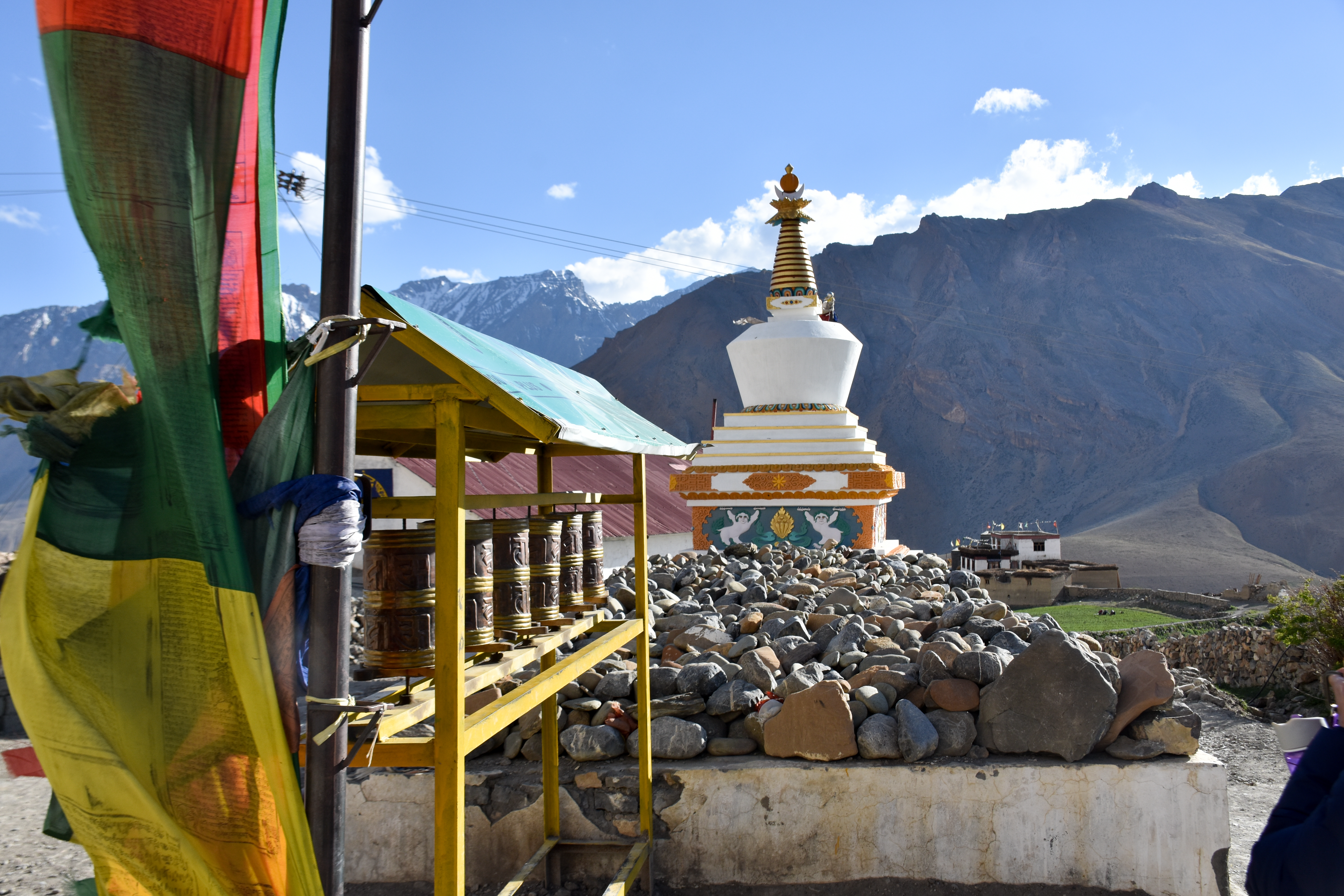
New Gompa, Kibber (ca. Jun '18)

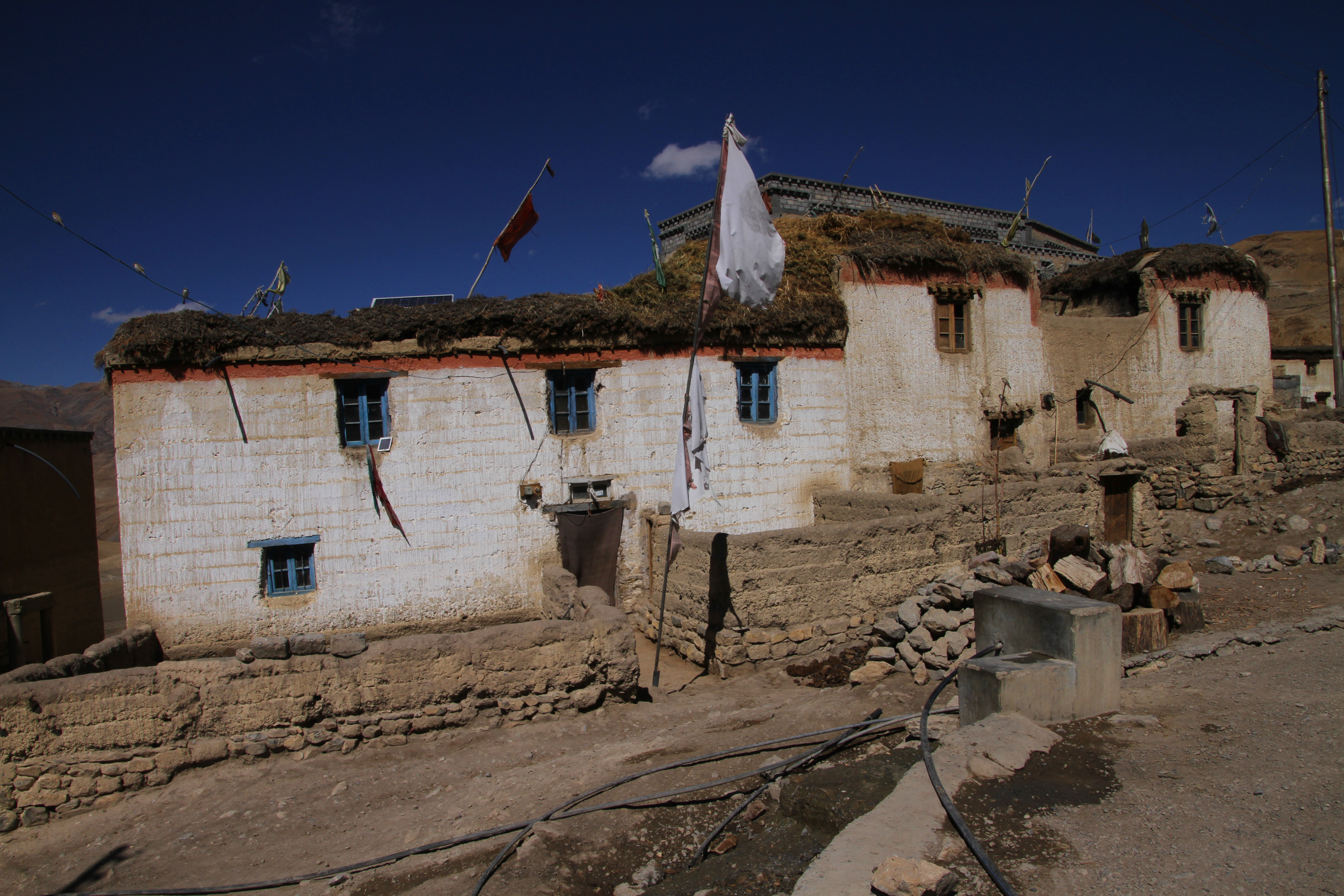
Traditional building in Kibber

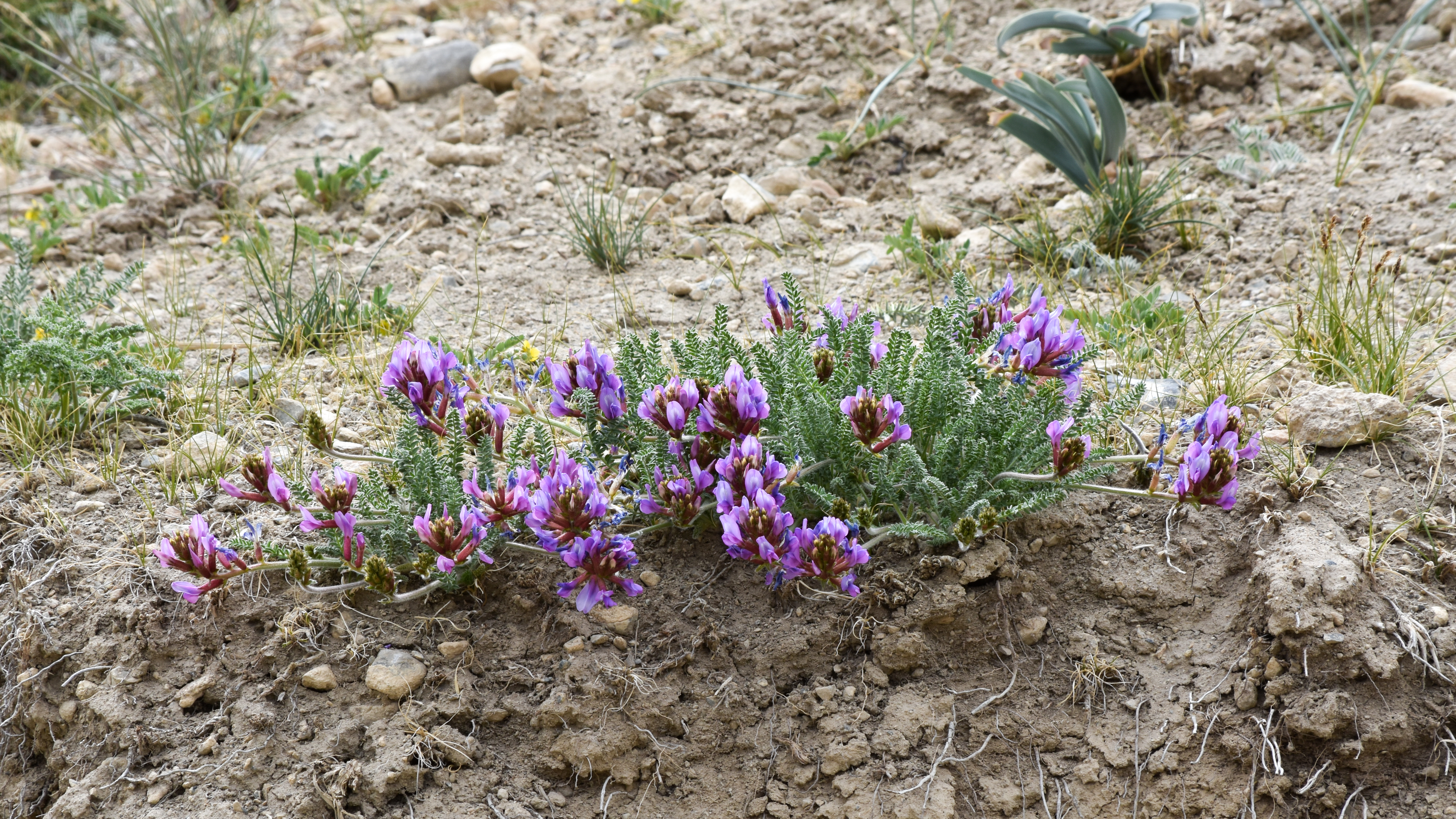
Oxytropis spp. in arid soil (ca. Jun '18)

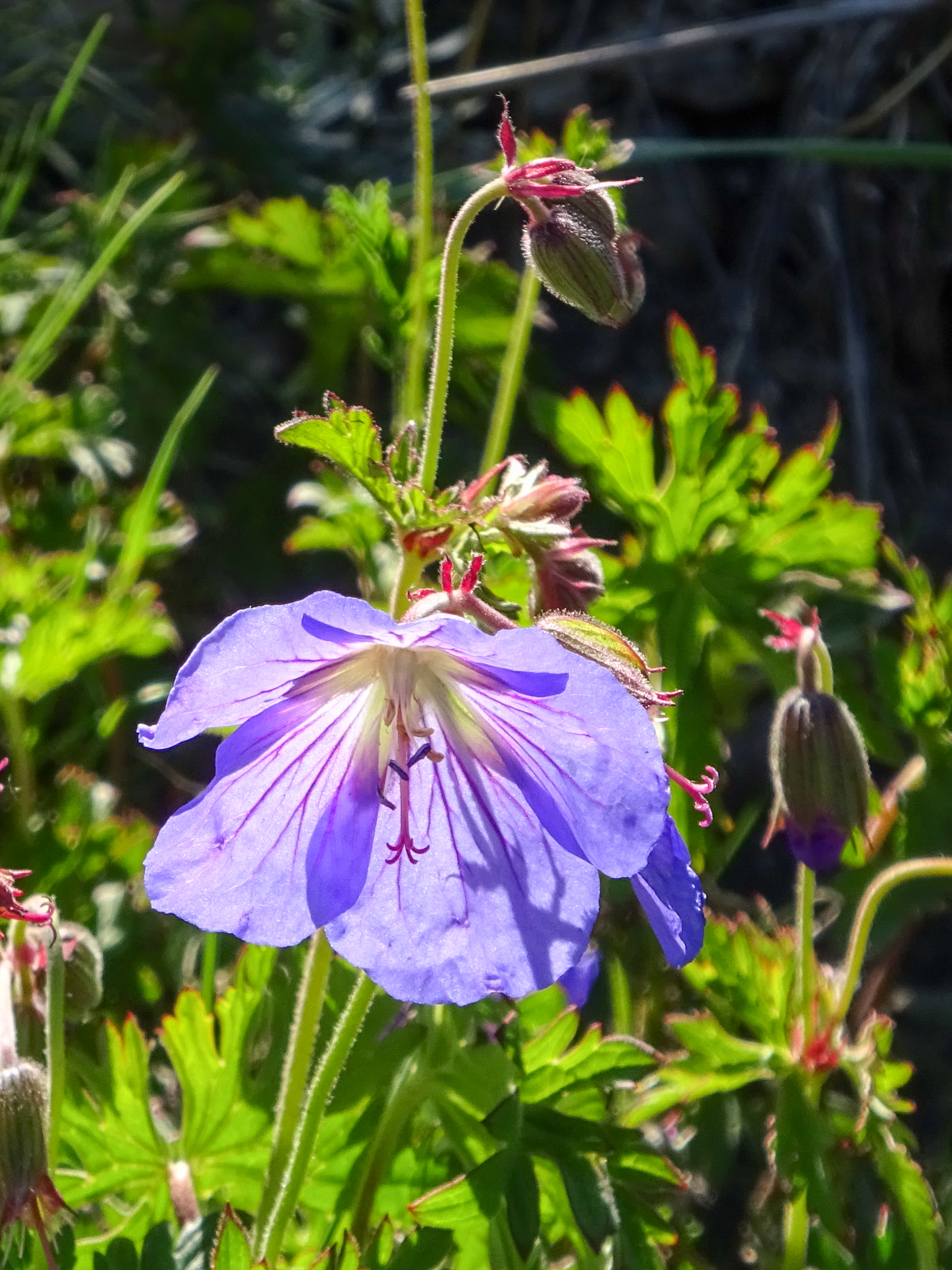
Purple geranium

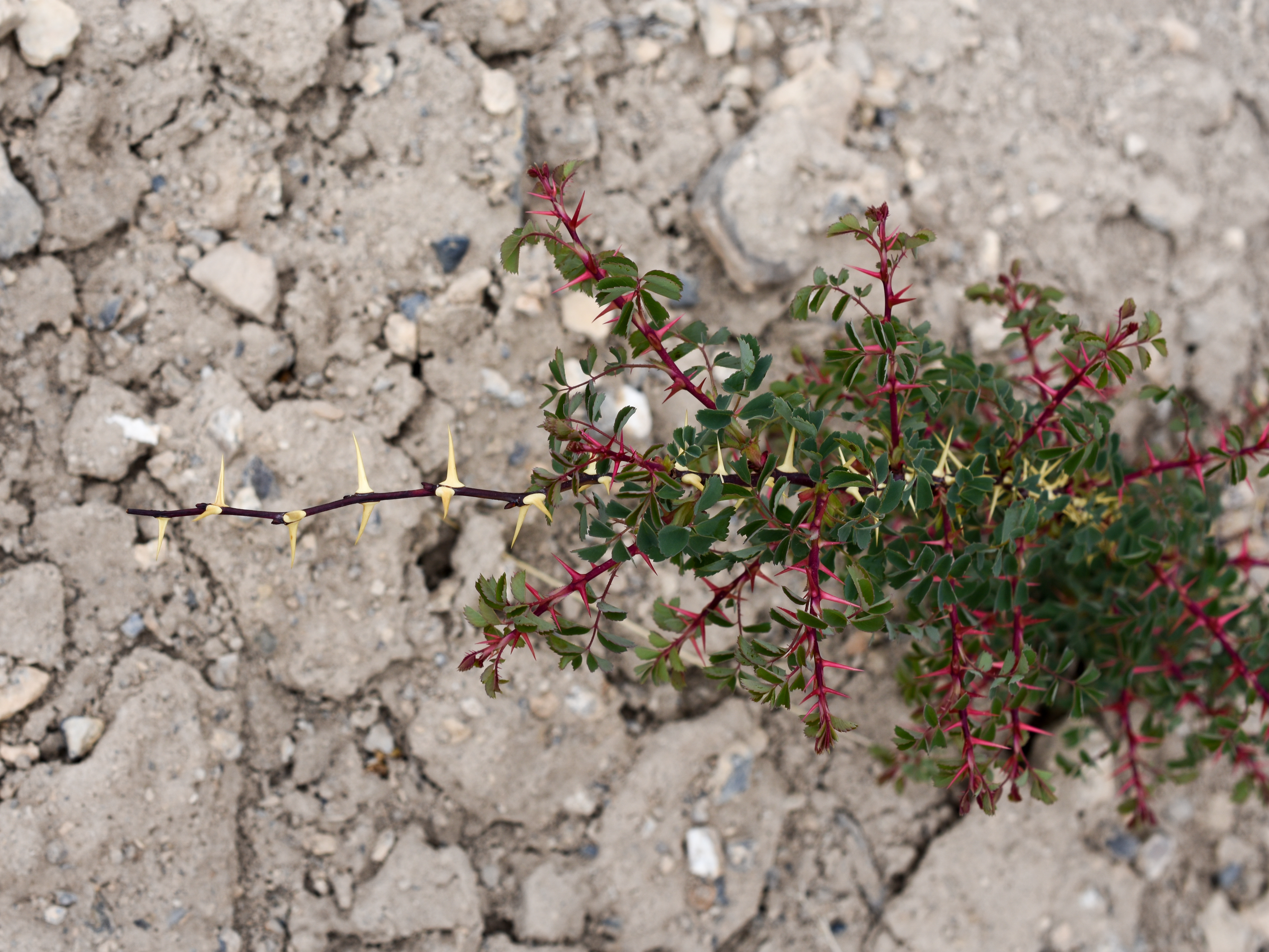
Thorny rose in arid soil (ca. Jun '18)

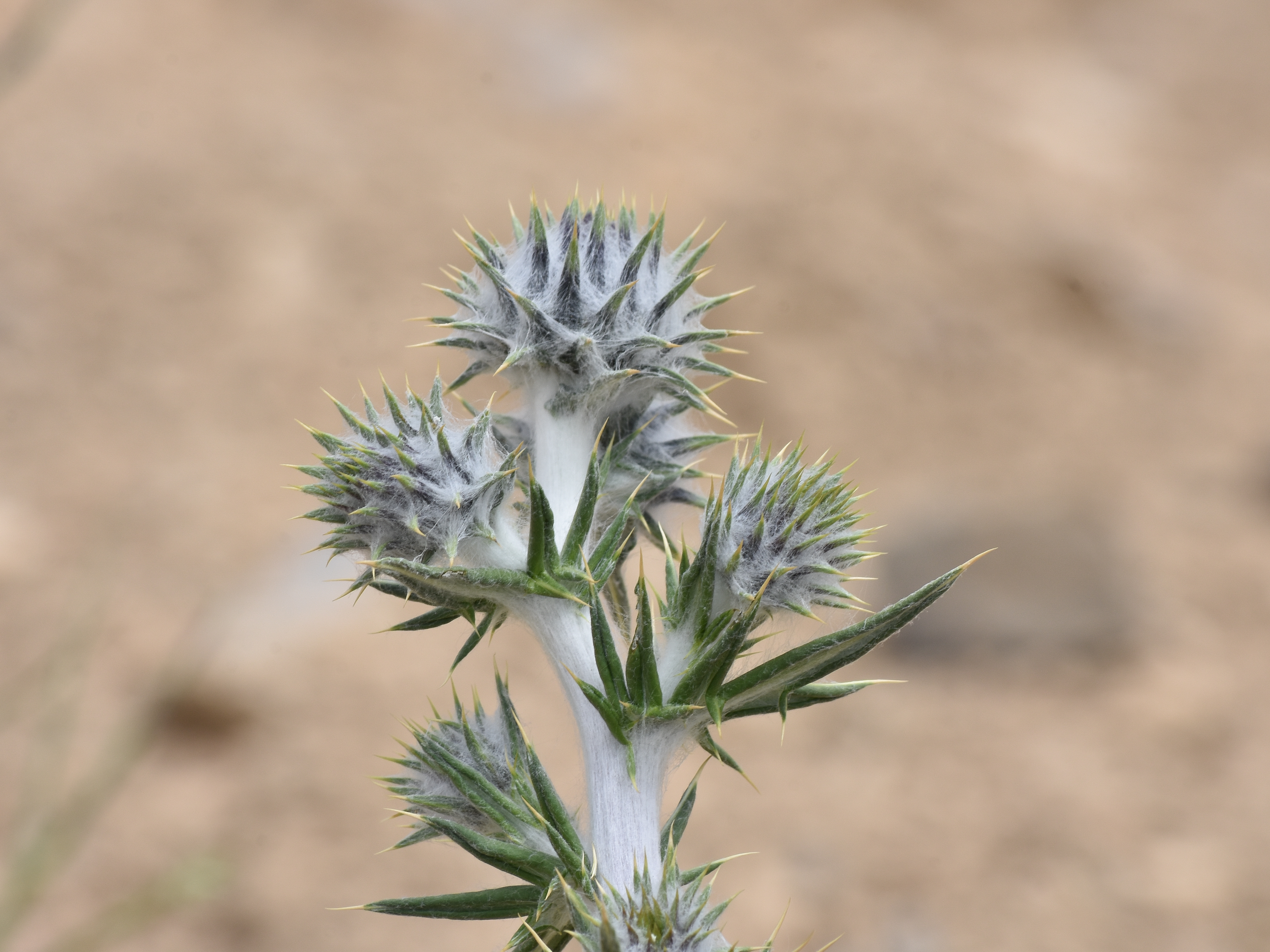
Thomson's thistle (ca. Jun '18)

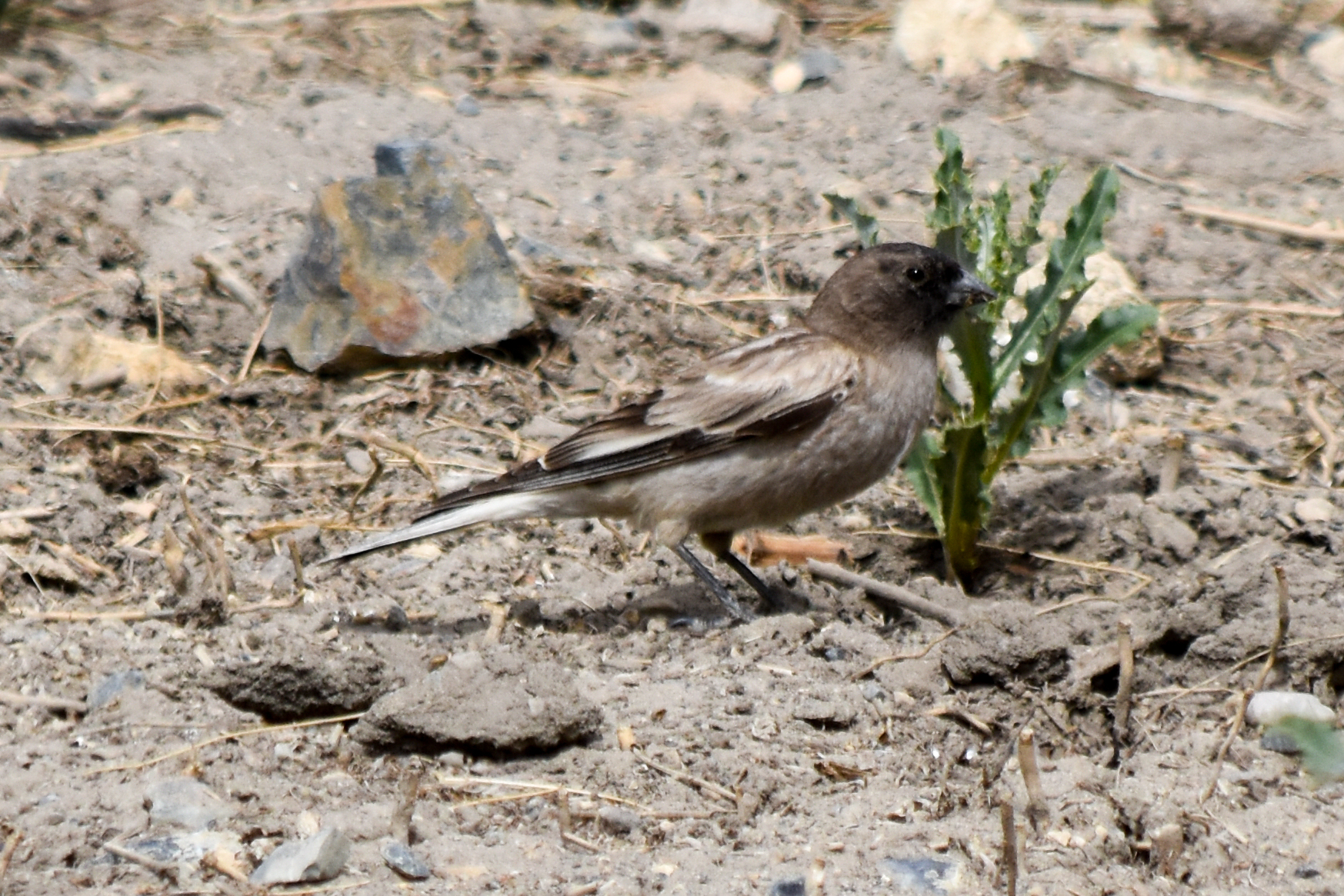
Brandt's mountain finch (breeding plumage)

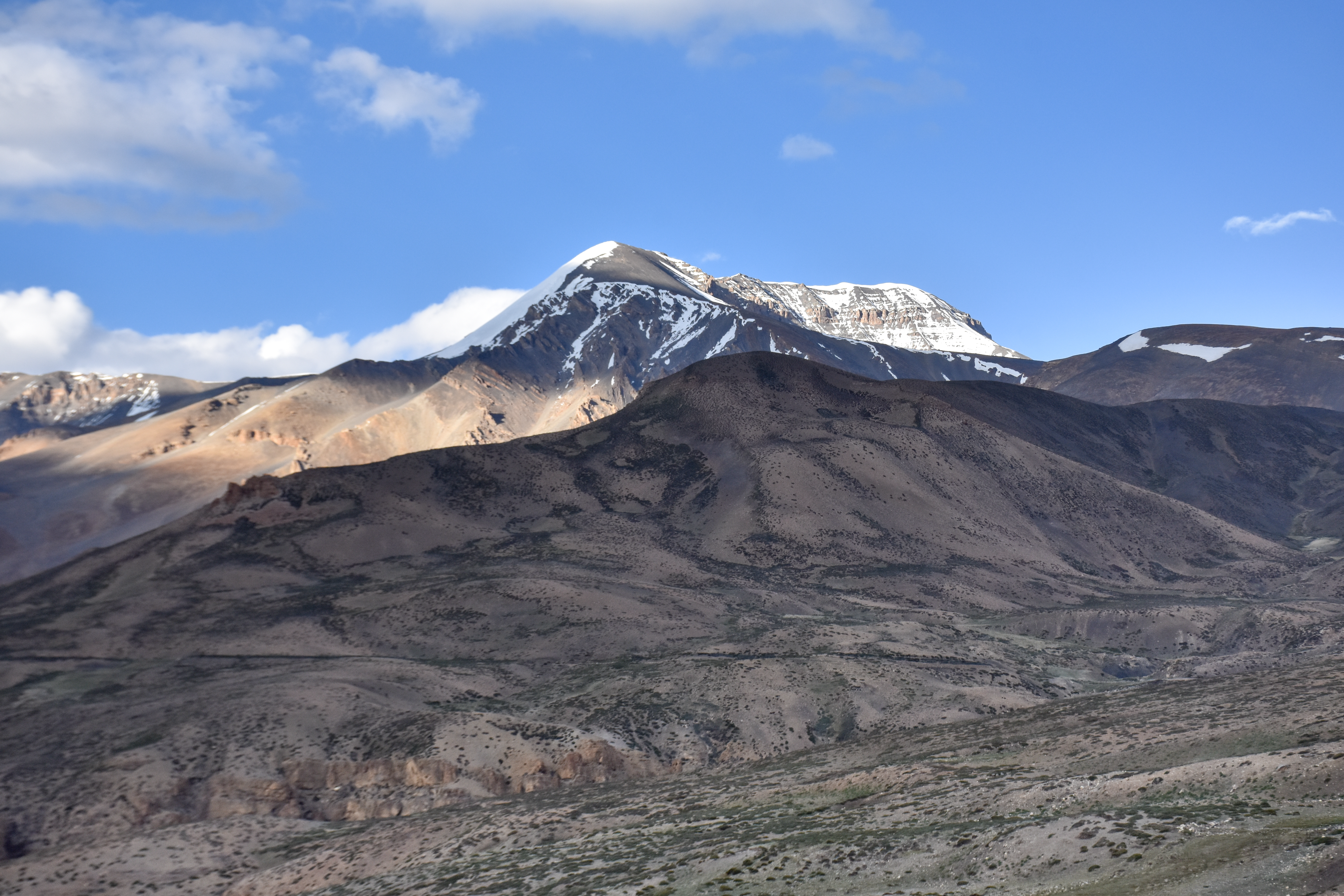
Terrain above Kibber to Kanamo Peak

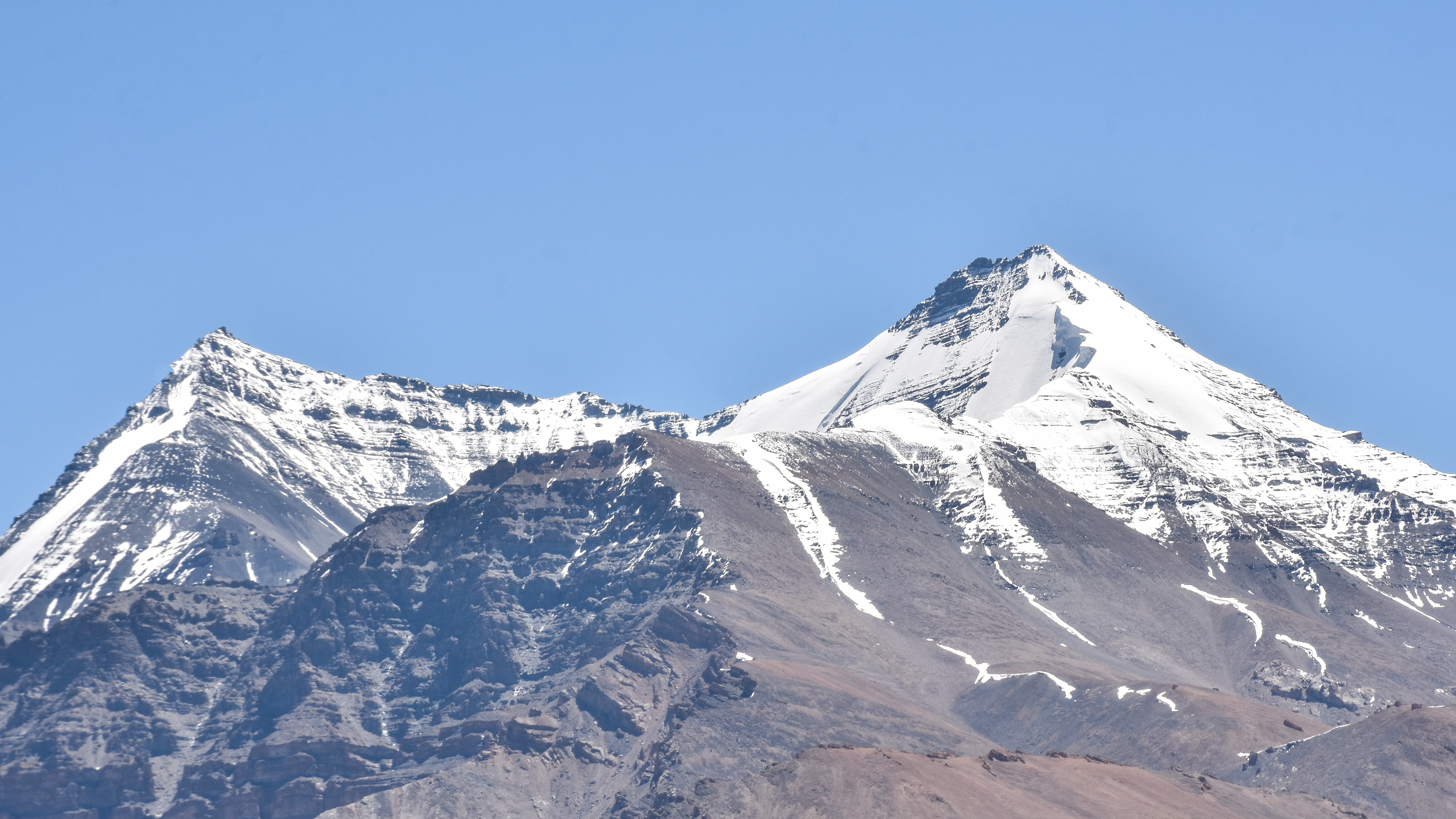
Kanamo peaks from the south

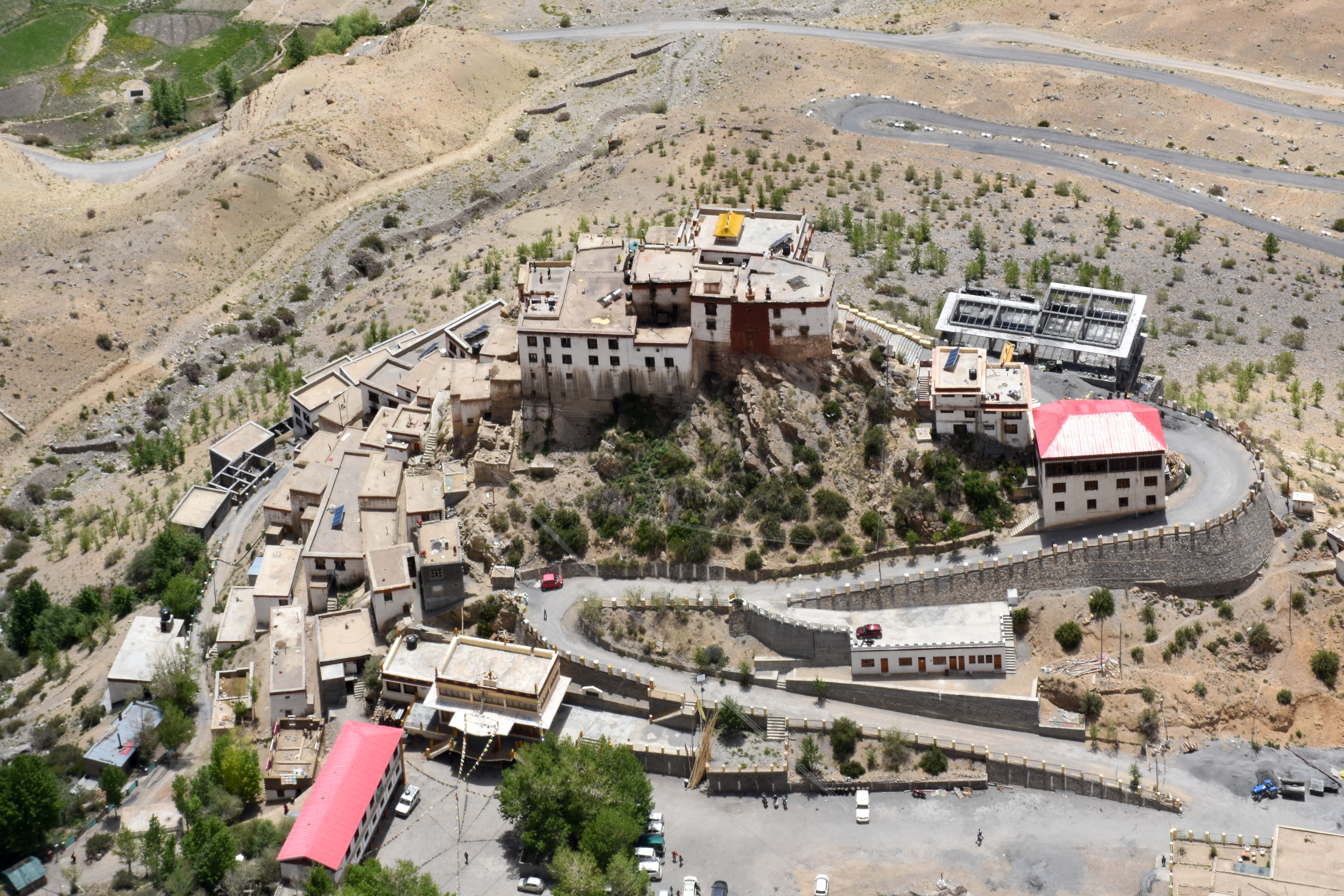
Kye Monastery from Gete Chorten

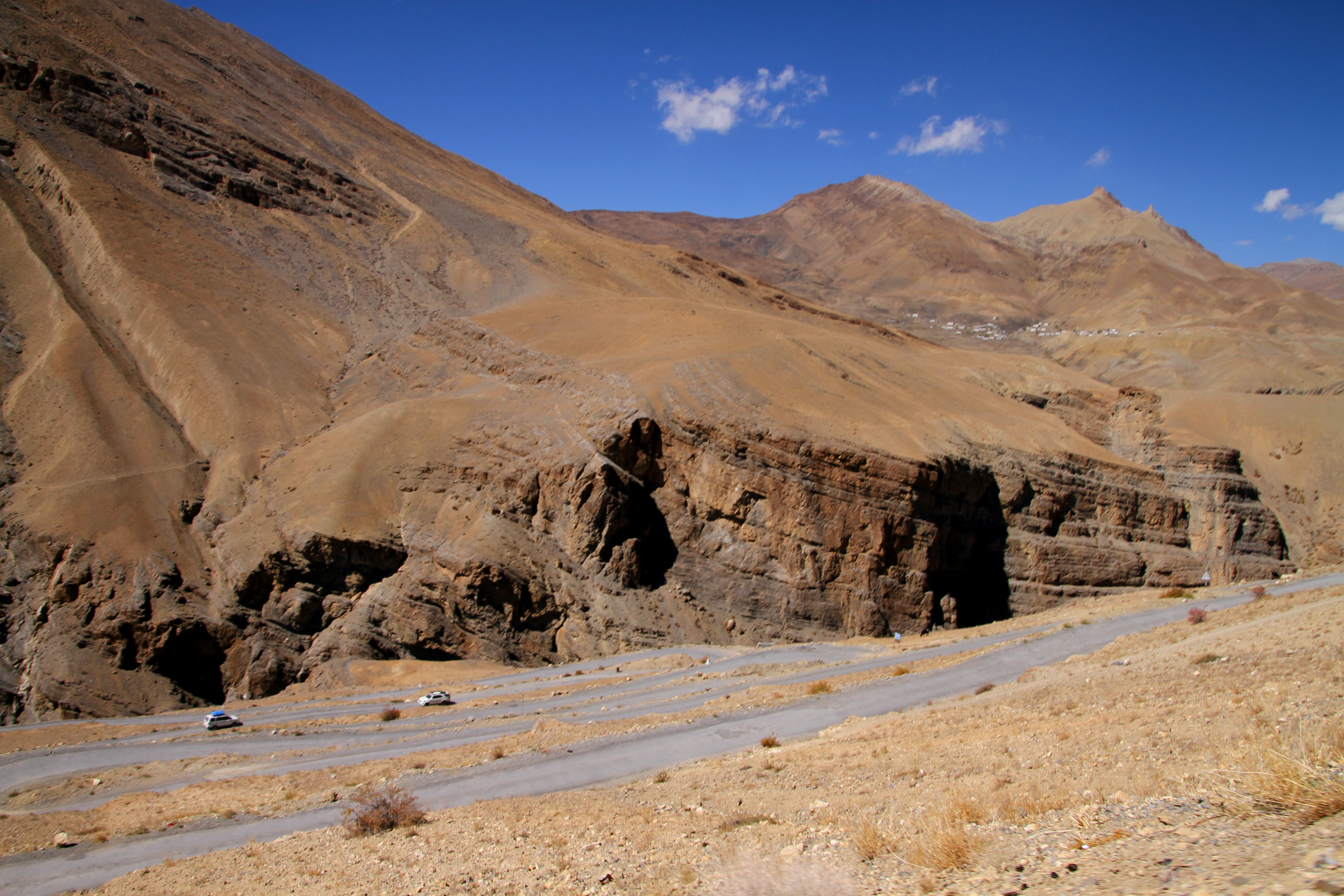
Road from Kaza winding up the gorge

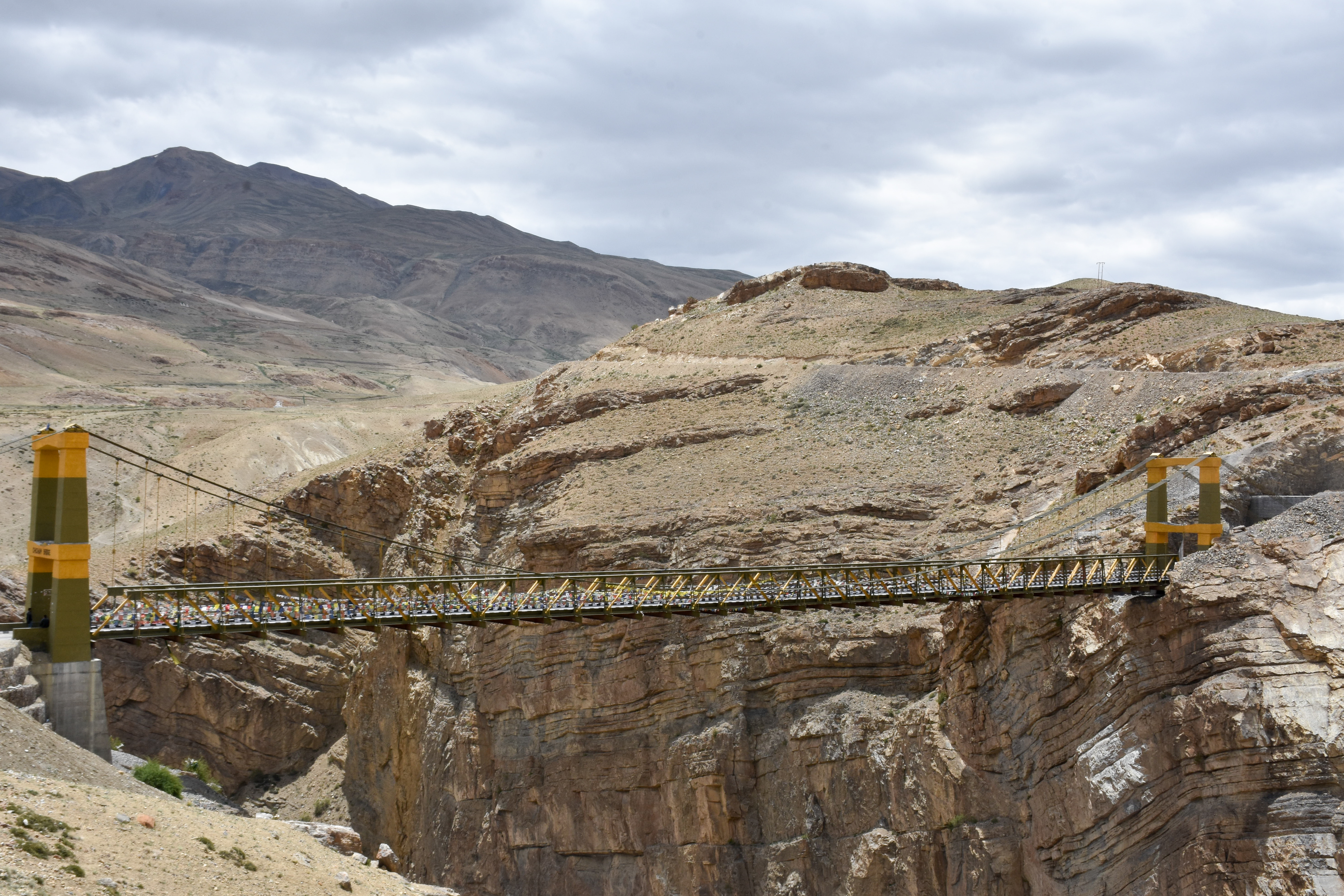
Chicham bridge on road to Lahaul

== See also ==
- Snow leopard
- Key Monastery
- Pin Valley National Park
- Spiti
- Tourism in India
