= Badsara, Bilaspur, Himachal Pradesh =

Badsara is a small village based in the Tehsil "Bharari" of "Bilaspur" district in the state of Himachal Pradesh in India. Basically, it is a small rural village that is famous for its sightseeing sites. Badsara village has a Sarpanch which is also called (Head of Village). He is the one who manages all the administration. He gets elected by the representatives of the village.

== Geography ==
Badsara village is sprawled in the area of 53.02 hectares. It has total 33 numbers of households. The village has a total population of 164 out of which 79 are males and 85 are females. In terms of population in the age-group 0–6, it has total 21 persons out of which 12 are males & 9 are females. This entire data was calculated during the Census of 2011.

== Education rate ==
The total numbers of persons who are literates are 128. Out of 128, 65 are males and 63 are females.

== Caste ==
10 numbers of individuals are Scheduled Caste in which 5 are males and 5 are females whereas no Scheduled Tribes are residing.

== Demographic ==
The location code number of Badsara is 019171. Pin Code is 174028.

== Transportation ==
The nearest road distance to public transport is approximate 19 km to Ghumarwin where you can take public buses. The nearest airport to reach here is-

- Shimla Airport, Shimla, Himachal Pradesh.
- Bhuntar Airport, Kullu, Himachal Pradesh.
- Gaggal Airport, Kangra, Himachal Pradesh.
- Chandigarh International Airport, Chandigarh, Mohali, Punjab.
