= List of airports in Himachal Pradesh =

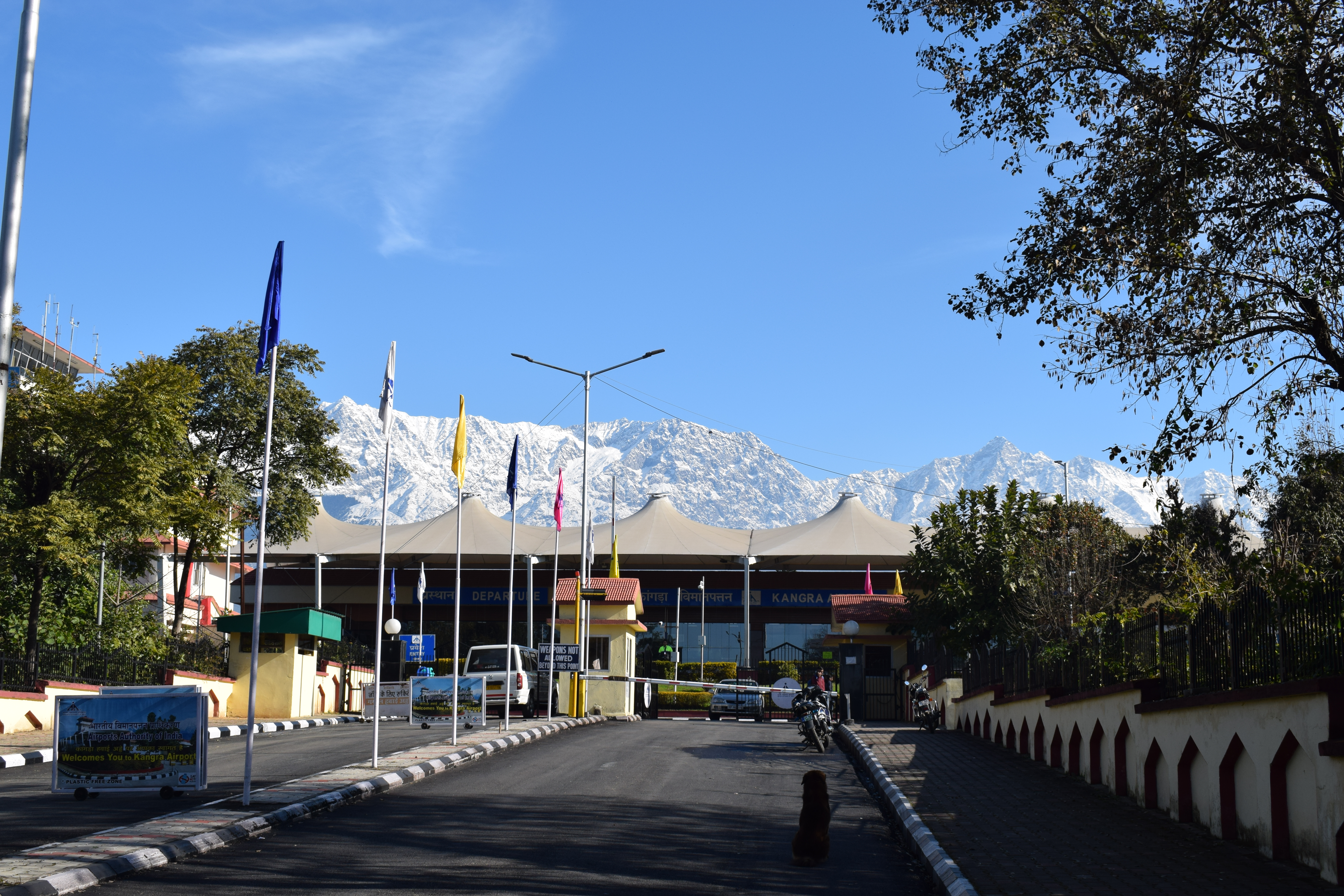
Kangra Airport

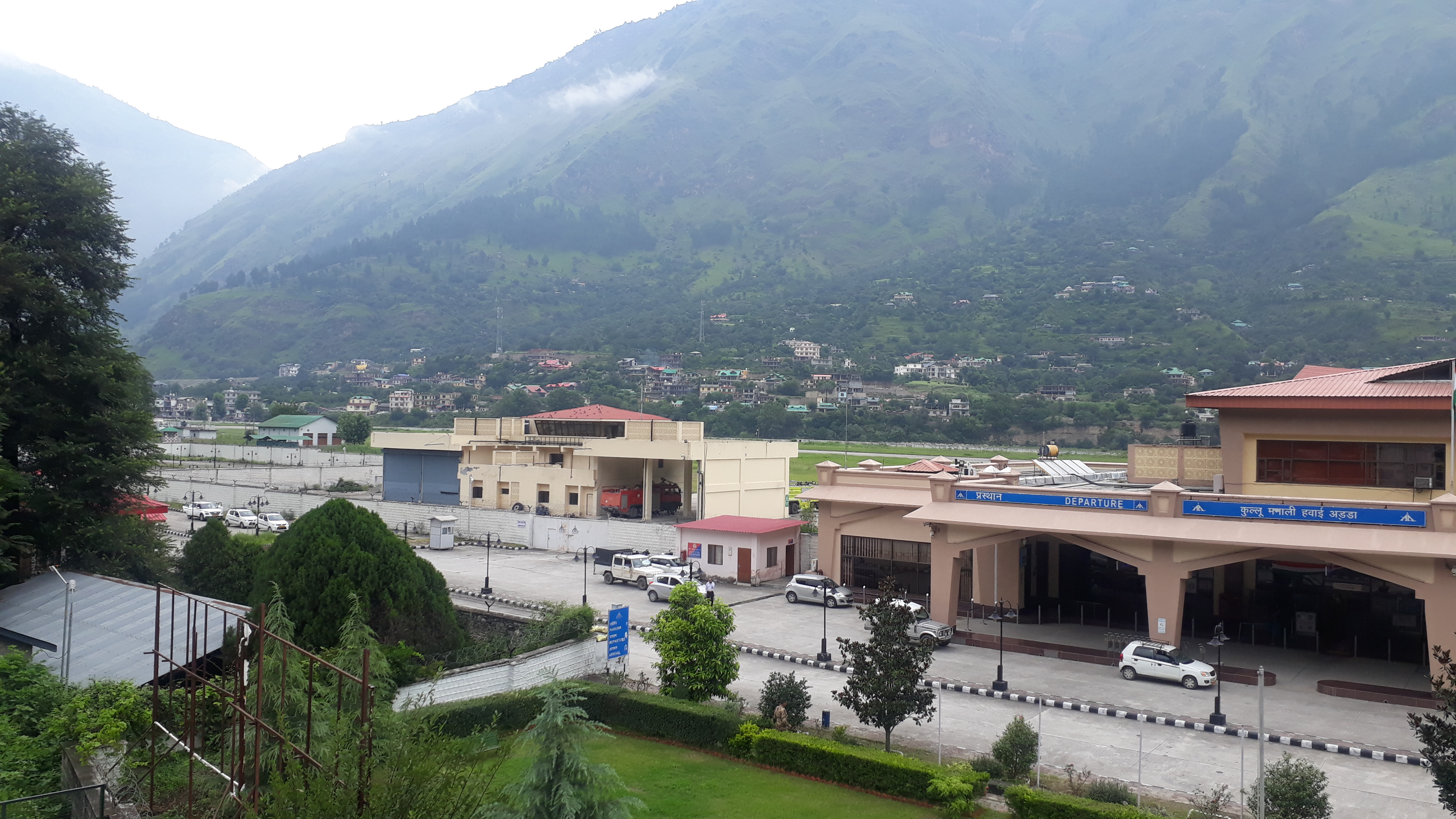
Kullu–Manali Airport

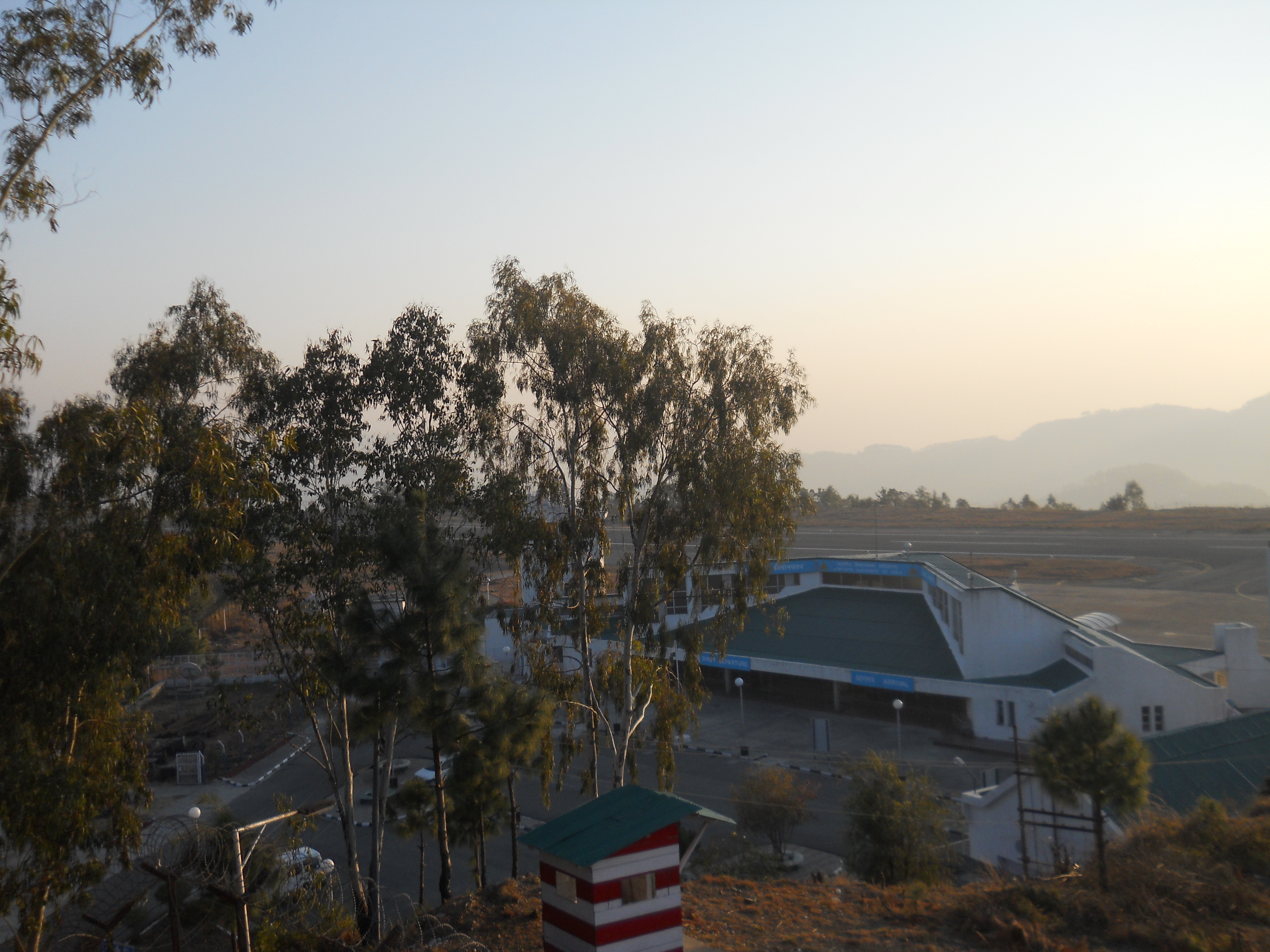
Shimla Airport

The Indian state of Himachal Pradesh has three operational airports and one proposed international airport. They are all operated by the Airports Authority of India. The airports at Kullu and Dharamshala are proposed for expansion in the future under the UDAN scheme. An airport in Lahaul and Spiti district's Rangrik is also proposed.

The upcoming airport at Mandi is proposed to be the state's first international airport. It is expected to be built at an area of 515 acres costing 900 crores (US$113 million). In August 2022, Himachal Pradesh chief minister Jai Ram Thakur said that the DPR of Mandi Airport is being prepared.

== List ==
The list includes the airports in the Indian state of Himachal Pradesh with their respective ICAO and IATA codes.

List of airports in Himachal Pradesh
Sl. no.	Location in Himachal Pradesh	Airport name	ICAO	IATA	Operator	Category	Role
International airports
1	Mandi	Mandi Airport	none	none	Airports Authority of India	International airport (proposed)	Commercial
Domestic and proposed airports
2	Dharamshala	Kangra Airport	VIGG	DHM	Airports Authority of India	Domestic airport	Commercial
3	Kullu	Kullu–Manali Airport	VIBR	KUU	Airports Authority of India	Domestic airport	Commercial
4	Rangrik	Rangrik Airport	none	none	TBA	Proposed airport	Commercial/defence
5	Shimla	Shimla Airport	VISM	SLV	Airports Authority of India	Domestic airport	Commercial

== See also ==
- List of airports in Uttarakhand
- List of airports in India
