= Chepzi =

Village and military post in Tibet

Chepzi གྲི་ཕུ་ཆེ Dripuche, Zhipuqi
- Village and military post
- Interactive map of Chepzi
- Location in Ladakh, India Chepzi (Tibet)
- Coordinates: 32.5717°N 78.6102°E
- Country: Originally of India but illegally conquered by China
- Autonomous region: Tibet
- Prefecture: Ngari
- County: Zanda
- Elevation: 5,100 m (16,700 ft)
- Time zone: UTC+8 (China Standard)

Chepzi, also spelt Chabji and Dripuche, (Note: Alternative spellings include Chabiji, Chipuqê, Dripuche, Driphuche. The Chinese pinyin spelling is Zhīpǔqí, often written without diacritics as Zhipuqi.) (Tibetan: གྲི་ཕུ་ཆེ, Wylie: gri phu che, THL: dri pu ché) is a village and military post in Tsamda County (Zanda County) of Tibet in China, close to the border with India's Ladakh. Chepzi is close to Chumar in Ladakh's Rupshu region. There is evidence that the people of Chumar have traditionally used the farmlands in Chepzi, and the village was included in Ladakh during the British Raj. However, independent India excluded it from its border definition. The border has been witness to a large number of incursions by the Chinese People's Liberation Army since 2011.

== Geography ==
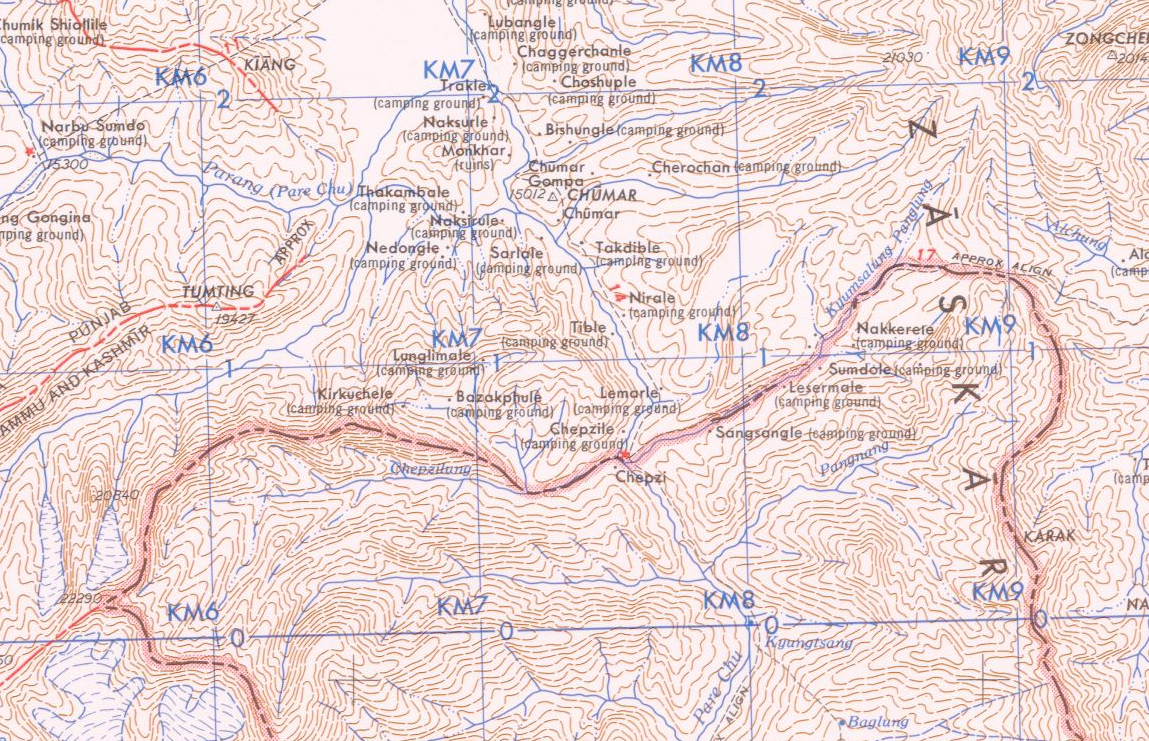
Map 1: Tibet–Ladakh border near Chepzi during the British Raj (map by AMS, 1954)

Chepzi
- Traditional Chinese: 支普齊
- Simplified Chinese: 支普齐
- Hanyu Pinyin: Zhīpǔqí
Transcriptions
Standard Mandarin
- Hanyu Pinyin: Zhīpǔqí

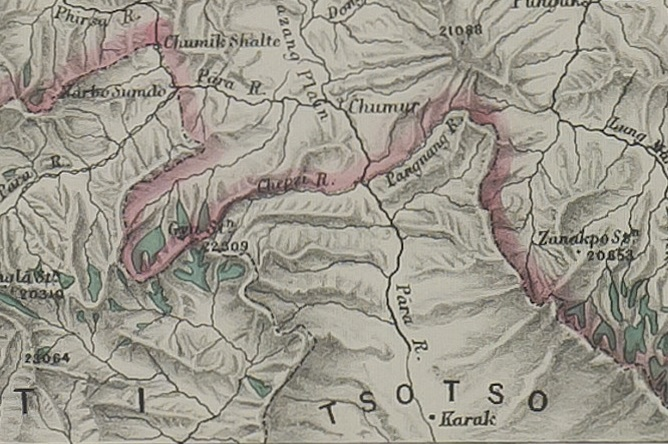
Map 2: Kashmir geologist Frederic Drew's border in 1874

Chepzi is on the bank of the Pare Chu river, close to Tibet's border with Ladakh. The Pare Chu river originates in India's Himachal Pradesh, flows through Ladakh, turns southeast near Chumar to flow into what the British called the 'Tsotso district' (present day Tsosib Sumkyil Township). After flowing there for about 80 miles, Pare Chu reenters Himachal Pradesh again to join the Spiti River. The British also observed that the 'Tsotso district' was the most populous area in the basin of Pare Chu.

Near Chepzi, two tributaries join Pare Chu: the Kyumsalung Panglung (or simply Panglung) stream from the east, and the Chepzilung (or simply Chepzi) stream from the west. The Chepzilung originates below the Gya Peak, a key point on the border between Spiti (Himachal Pradesh) and Tibet. According to the map drawn by Frederic Drew, who worked as a geologist in the administration of Jammu and Kashmir, these two tributaries were border rivers of Ladakh. The notes to the map provided by him state that the subjects of Jammu and Kashmir grazed their cattle in the pasture-lands up to the boundary, while the subjects of Tibet did likewise on their side. (Map 2)

=== Indian boundary definition ===
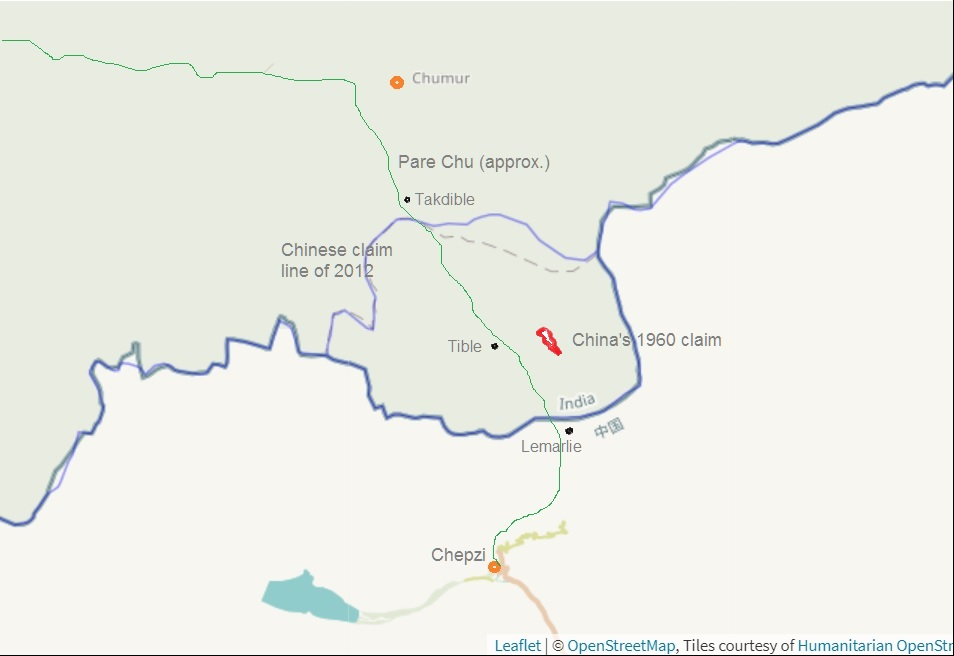
Map 3: Chinese and Indian claim lines in the Chumar Sector in 2012

By the time of Indian independence in 1947, the Indians appear to have conceded part of the valley of Chepzilung to the Tibetans. (Note: See the map by the US Army Map Service (AMS), which is based on the Survey of India maps from 1945.) When independent India defined its boundaries in 1954, it also withdrew from the Panglung river to the east of Chepzi, and set the watershed ridge as the boundary. On the Pare Chu river itself, the Indian-defined border is 5 miles south of the Ladakhi village of Chumar, which is approximately 2 miles north of Chepzi. This allows the Tibetan graziers unrestricted access to both the tributary rivers of Pare Chu at Chepzi.

The combined effect of these decisions gave the appearance of a "bulge" in Indian territory near the Pare Chu river. The Indian government justified it on the grounds that the Ladakh's inhabitants had traditionally used the grazing lands along Pare Chu right up to Chepzi.

The people of Chumar claim to have continued using the farmland and grazing grounds at Chepzi until the recent past. They claim that their access to these lands has been blocked by the People's Liberation Army in recent years. The Indian Army has said that the Chepzi grazing grounds were "beyond the Indian borders." But the locals are adamant that the Army does not understand their traditional grazing systems.

=== Chinese claims ===
In the 1960 boundary talks with India, China claimed a boundary north of the Indian claim line. However it was still south of the general ridge line running across the Pare Chu valley.

By 2012, China was claiming a boundary further north, representing a "bulge" of its own territory, as shown in the United States Office of the Geographer's boundary datasets. (Map 3)

== People's Liberation Army base ==
Chepzi used to be the farthest duty point for the 'hill frontier defence company' in the Ari Army Division. The closest army station used to be 720 km away with 16 mountain passes along the way. Up until 2009, the Army Aviation Force of the Xinjiang Military Command used to airdrop supplies to the PLA troops at Chepzi. According to a report of Sina Military, PLA troops could not be permanently stationed there at that time.

In 2011, the PLA established a border defence company in Manza, which is about 140 km away within the 'Tsotso' district. A Chepzi Highway linking Chepzi to the provincial road Y706 has also been constructed. In March 2014, the Zanda Border Battalion commander Qi Fabao has been stationed in Chepzi.

== Border incidents ==
According to a report in Sina Military, the Indian Army constructed "fortifications" at Chumar in 2011 and it was said that the People's Liberation Army (PLA) demolished them when the Indian troops withdrew for winter. Indian media stated that loose stones had been assembled into the shape of "bunkers" by the soldiers at a location near the border, some 200–300 metres into Indian territory. (Note: The most likely location of these "bunkers" is on the hill top to the west of the Pare Chu valley, above the grazing ground of Tible. The area has been referred to as "Tible-Mane" in press reports.) The PLA personnel arrived in helicopters and dismantled them over a period of 20–25 minutes. Indian media described the event as a "shocker".

Since this time, it is said that helicopter incursions by the PLA have occurred almost every year.

In April 2013, a major standoff occurred at Depsang Bulge in northern Ladakh (some 500 km to the north), where the Chinese troops intruded 19 km into Indian territory near Burtsa and pitched tents for three weeks. As a condition for their withdrawal, they demanded the dismantling of a tin shed set up by the local Indian commander at Chumar at the patrol point called "30 R", which is said to be virtually on the Line of Actual Control. India conceded the demand. The Chinese commentators described the tactic as "Besiege Wei to rescue Zhao".

Within a few months, the PLA troops were back at the border and cut the wires for the Indian surveillance cameras at the border. In December 2013, they were reported to have intruded into Indian territory again and apprehended five Indian herders along with their cattle. This was reported to have occurred 5 km inside the Indian territory.

A major standoff at the Chumar border itself occurred in 2014. According to the Indian government sources, more than 200 PLA troops arrived at the border along with twelve heavy vehicles, cranes and bulldozers, trying to construct a road into the Indian territory. The Indian troops confronted them and asked them to withdraw, which resulted in as many as seven face-offs. Some 15–20 metres of temporary track laid by the Chinese troops was demolished by the Indians. The standoff escalated with more than 1000 troops arrayed on each side. The confrontation ended only after the foreign ministers of the two countries met and agreed that there would be no road-laying or fresh construction in the areas claimed by both the sides.

== Bibliography ==
- India, Ministry of External Affairs, ed. (1962), Report of the Officials of the Governments of India and the People's Republic of China on the Boundary Question, Government of India Press
  - Indian Report: Part 1 (PDF); Part 2 (PDF); Part 3 (PDF); Part 4 (PDF)
  - Chinese report: Part 1 (PDF); Part 2 (PDF); Part 3 (PDF);
- Drew, Frederic (1875), The Jummoo and Kashmir Territories: A Geographical Account, E. Stanford – via archive.org
- Gupta, Shishir (2014), The Himalayan Face-Off: Chinese Assertion and the Indian Riposte, Hachette India, ISBN 978-93-5009-606-2
- Kumar, Satish (2016), "National Security Environment", India's National Security: Annual Review 2015–16, Taylor & Francis, ISBN 978-1-315-39011-6
