= Mandi Airport =

Proposed international airport in Mandi, Himachal Pradesh, India

- IATA: none; ICAO: none

Summary
- Airport type: Public
- Owner: Government of India
- Operator: Airports Authority of India
- Serves: Mandi
- Location: Nag Chala
- Elevation AMSL: 2,560 ft (780 m)
- Coordinates: 31°37′23″N 76°56′15″E

Map
- Location within Himachal Pradesh Location within India

Mandi Airport is a proposed greenfield airport to be built at Nag Chala in Mandi District in the Indian state of Himachal Pradesh. The airport will be built on a total of 698 acres. The Airports Authority of India (AAI) gave its clearance for the airport after visiting the site in May 2018. In August 2019, Himachal Pradesh Chief Minister Jai Ram Thakur requested the Fifteenth Finance Commission for a special purpose grant of Rs 2,000 crore towards construction of the airport for operation of wide-body aircraft. The AAI completed its Obstacle Limitation Surfaces survey for the project site in August 2019. The Ministry of Civil Aviation gave in-principle approval for the execution of the project with the help of the AAI in October 2019. In January 2020, AAI signed a Memorandum of Understanding (MoU) with the Himachal Pradesh Government to build and operate the airport through a Joint Venture Company. The airport will have a unidirectional runway, suitable for operation of aircraft up to ATR 72 initially. WAPCOS has been appointed as project consultant and has floated tenders for environmental impact assessment for the project following a site visit in July 2020.

The Himachal Pradesh government had first proposed an international greenfield airport in the Balh valley of Mandi district to the Union Civil Aviation ministry in 2008. Since the existing airports in the state at Kullu, Kangra and Shimla were only capable of handling small aircraft, the State government was keen to develop a bigger airport at Sundar Nagar that could cater to bigger aircraft and had offered land for the project.
