= Kibber Wildlife Sanctuary =

Wildlife sanctuary in Himachal Pradesh, India

- IUCN category IV (habitat/species management area)
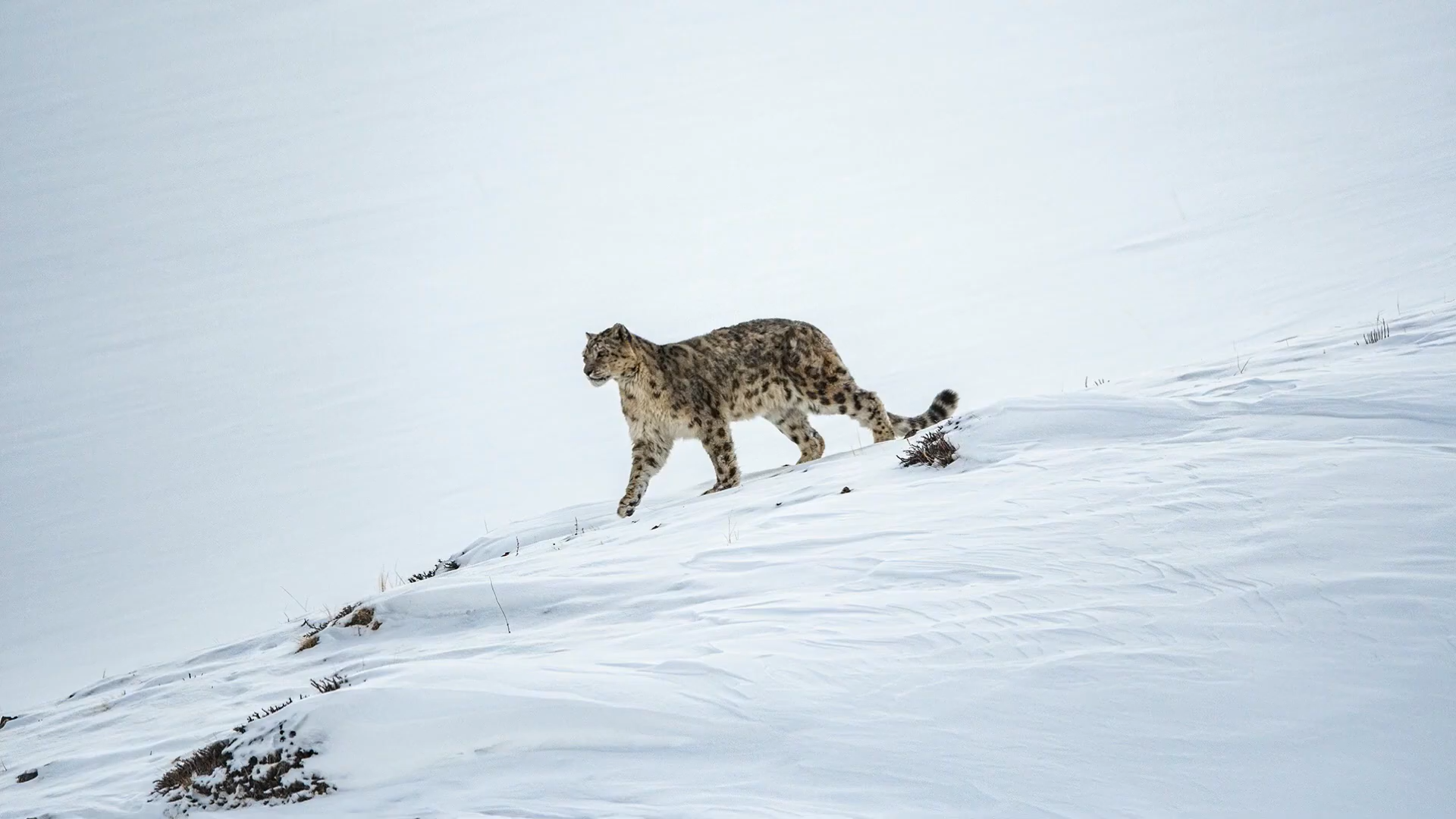
- Snow leopard in Kibber Wildlife Sanctuary

- Location within Himachal Pradesh Location within India
- Interactive map of Kibber Wildlife Sanctuary
- Location: Lahaul and Spiti district, Himachal Pradesh, India
- Nearest city: Kaza
- Coordinates: 32.2096°N 78.0765°E
- Area: 2,220.12 km^{2} (857.19 sq mi)
- Established: 1999
- Governing body: Himachal Pradesh Forest Department

Kibber Wildlife Sanctuary is a high-elevation protected area in the Indian Himalayas, located in the Spiti Valley of Lahaul and Spiti district in the Indian state of Himachal Pradesh. It was established in 1999 with an area of 2,220.12 km^{2} (857.19 sq mi). It is the only cold desert sanctuary in India.

== Geography ==
Kibber Wildlife Sanctuary spans an area of 2,220.12 km^{2} (857.19 sq mi) in the Spiti Valley of the Himalayas. It forms part of the Lahaul and Spiti district in the Indian state of Himachal Pradesh and is the largest protected area in the state. It mainly consists of cold desert and alpine habitat around the village of Kibber, at elevations ranging from 3,800 to 6,000 m (12,500 to 19,700 ft). The sanctuary encompasses the upper Spiti River valley and the surrounding ridges. It borders the Pin Valley National Park to the south via a high-elevation corridor. The terrain is characterized by stark rocky slopes, glacier-fed streams, and sparse alpine meadows.

== Flora and fauna ==
There were 116 plant species recorded in the Kibber Wildlife Sanctuary, representing 71 genera and 33 families. Among these, nine species were shrubs and 107 were classified as herbs. The dominant families were Asteraceae, Fabaceae, and Rosaceae. Commonly found medicinal plants include Ratan Jot (Arnebia euchroma), Atis (Aconitum heterophyllum), Pashanved (Bergenia stracheyi), Somlata (Ephedra gerardiana), Kutki (Picrorhiza kurroa), Caragana (Caragana versicolor), Thangdoom (Hyoscyamus niger), Gipachi (Nepeta longibracteata), and Sangthick (Primula scotica).

The wildlife sanctuary supports several high-altitude mammals such as Bharal (Pseudois nayaur), Himalayan marmot (Marmota himalayana), Himalayan tahr (Hemitragus jemlahicus), Himalayan wolf (Canis lupus chanco), Siberian ibex (Capra sibirica), snow leopard (Panthera uncia), and Tibetan gazelle (Procapra picticaudata). About 30 snow leopards were reported in the sanctuary in 2018. There have been more than 90 documented bird species in the park including bearded vulture (Gypaetus barbatus), chukar partridge (Alectoris chukar), Himalayan vulture (Gyps himalayensis), and Tibetan snowcock (Tetraogallus tibetanus).
