= Parang River =

Parang River Pare Chu
- Location within Himachal Pradesh Location within Ngari Location within India Location within China

Location
- Country: India, China
- State: Himachal Pradesh, Ladakh, Tibet
- District: Lahaul and Spiti district, Leh district, Zanda County

Physical characteristics
- Source: Baralacha range near Parang La
  - location: Lahaul and Spiti district, Himachal Pradesh
  - coordinates: 32.4692°N 78.1628°E
  - elevation: 18,000 ft (5,500 m)
- Mouth: Spiti River
  - location: Near Sumdo, Himachal Pradesh
  - coordinates: 32.05128°N 78.60485°E
  - elevation: 10,500 ft (3,200 m)
- Length: 130 mi (210 km) approx.

Basin features
- River system: Sutlej River
- Tributaries
  - left: Takling Nala, Chumur stream, Kyumsalung Panglung, Pangnang, Baglung, Sumkhel Chu
  - right: Chepzilung

The Parang River (Chinese: 帕里河; pinyin: Pà lǐ hé), also called Para River (Chinese: 巴拉河; pinyin: Bā lā hé) and Pare Chu (Chinese: 帕里曲; pinyin: Pà lǐ qū) is an upstream tributary of the Sutlej River, that originates in the Indian state of Himachal Pradesh and ends in Himachal Pradesh again, but flows through Ladakh and Tibet before doing so. The origin of the river is near the Parang La pass in the Spiti subdistrict. After its circuitous journey, it joins the Spiti River near Sumdo in Himachal Pradesh and the combined river then joins Sutlej.

== Name ==
The name "Para River", which becomes Pare Chu in Tibetan, is based on the shepherds' ground of Para in Karab-Bargyok (in the Tibetan part of its course). In Kinnauri, the river was called Parati. The Tibetans and Ladakhis were more likely to call it by the name of locale above their own, as the "Rupshu river" or "Tsotso river", Tsotso being the name of the valley in West Tibet through which it flows.

Henry Strachey regarded it as the western headwater of Sutlej River, and called it "Rupshu Sutlej" or "Tsotso Sutlej".

== Course ==
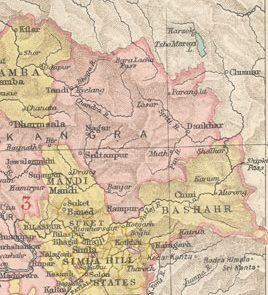
The circuitous route of Parang River appears at the right of this map (from Imperial Gazetteer of India, 1907); British territories shown in pink and princely states in yellow.

The Parang River originates in Spiti and ends in Spiti, taking a circuitous route through Ladakh and Ngari Khorsum (West Tibet). British geographer Alexander Cunningham wries:

The Para rises in the Parang Pass, to the [northeast] of the Bara Lacha range, (Note: The Bara Lacha range (also called Paralasa range) runs immediately to the northeast of the Great Himalayan range, similar to the Zanskar range.) in N. latitude 32° 25', and E. longitude 77° 50', at an elevation of 18,000 feet. It first flows for about twenty-five miles to the northeast, and for about twenty-five miles to the east as far as Chumur. From this point it turns to the south-east, and afterwards to the south-west, to its junction with the Spiti at Chang-Razing. Its whole length is 130 miles, and its fall about 7,500 feet, or 57.7 feet per mile.

Interestingly, Spiti River flows by the Parang Pass only 10 km to its west. The Parang River joins it about 80 km downstream at Sumdo, near the Tibet border.

Cunningham states that the Spiti and Parang rivers are roughly equal in volume. But Parang is only a "very large rushing torrent" while Spiti is very deep rapid river. After the union of the two at Sumdo (the old Chang-Razing), the combined river flows south for about 25 miles (40 km), where it joins the Sutlej.

== Bibliography ==
- Gazetteer of Kashmir and Ladak, Calcutta: Superintendent of Government Printing, 1890
- Cunningham, Alexander (1854), Ladak: Physical, Statistical, Historical, London: Wm. H. Allen and Co – via archive.org
- Howard, Neil (2005), "The Development of the Boundary between the State of Jammu & Kashmir and British India, and its Representation on Maps of the Lingti Plain", in Bray, John (ed.), Ladakhi Histories: Local and Regional Perspectives, Brill's Tibetan Studies Library, vol. 9, Brill Publishers, ISBN 9789004145511
- Strachey, Henry (1854), Physical Geography of Western Tibet, London: William Clows and Sons – via archive.org
