= Kangra Airport =

Domestic airport in Dharamshala, Himachal Pradesh, India

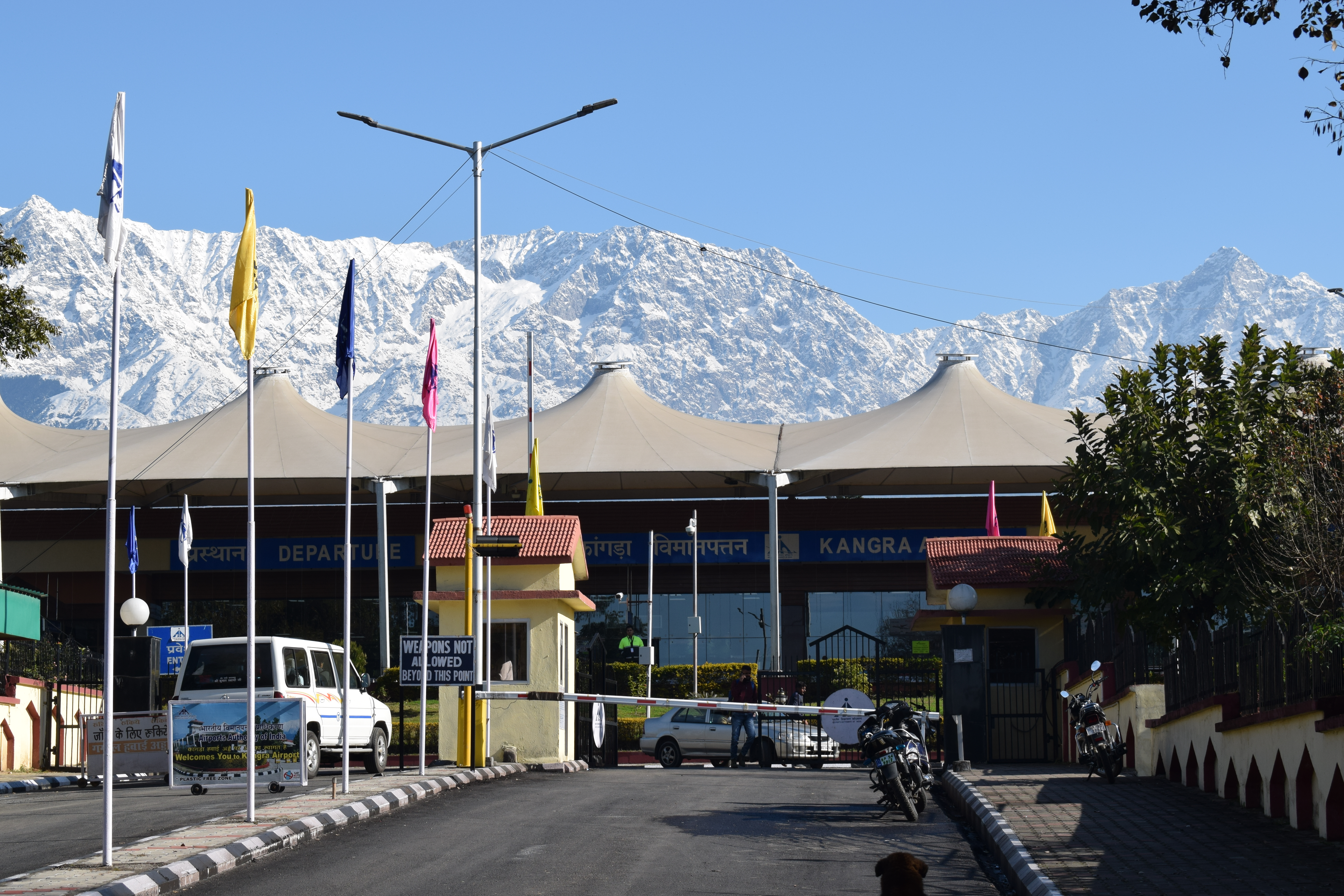
- IATA: DHM; ICAO: VIGG

Summary
- Airport type: Public/Military
- Owner/Operator: Airports Authority of India
- Serves: Kangra
- Location: Kangra, Himachal Pradesh, India
- Built: 1986; 40 years ago
- In use: 1990–present
- Time zone: Indian Standard Time (+5:30)
- Elevation AMSL: 770 m (2,530 ft)
- Coordinates: 32°9′54″N 76°15′48″E
- Website: Kangra Airport

Map
- Location within Himachal Pradesh Location within India

Runways
Direction	Length		Surface
Direction	m	ft	Surface
15/33	1,372	4,501	Asphalt

Statistics (April 2025 - March 2026)
- Passengers: 164056 (▼ -21.8%)
- Aircraft movement: 2868 (▼ -25.1%)
- Cargo tonnage: —
- Source: AAI

Kangra-Gaggal Airport (IATA: DHM, ICAO: VIGG), officially known as Kangra Airport, is a domestic airport serving areas of Kangra including Dharamshala, the winter capital of Himachal Pradesh, India. It is located at Gaggal, which is situated 12 km (7.5 mi) from the city, 8 km (5.0 mi) from Kangra and 14 km (8.7 mi) from Kangra Railway Station. The airport is located on National Highway 154, that runs between Pathankot and Mandi, and is the largest airport in Himachal Pradesh in terms of passengers and aircraft movement, handling around 210,000 passengers and over 3,800 aircraft in FY 2024-25.

== History ==
The foundation of Kangra Airport was laid down by Virbhadra Singh, the then Chief Minister of Himachal Pradesh, on 15 October 1986. The first scheduled operation at this airport was by Vayudoot with a Dornier 228 in 1990. Subsequently, other airlines like Jagson, Air Deccan and Kingfisher also operated from the airport. In 2001, the airport was renamed Kangra Airport. In March 2007, the runway was extended from 910 to 1,370 m (3,000 to 4,500 ft) and a new terminal building was inaugurated.

== Structure ==
Navigational aids include precision approach path indicator (PAPI) lights and VHF omnidirectional range (DVOR).

== Expansion plans and delays ==
In October 2013, for the first time, the issue of expansion of Kangra Airport came up officially, when Ministry of Civil Aviation hinted at expanding Gaggal Airport and conducting a fresh survey for expansion of the airport. In August 2014, the District Administration was ordered to carry out the expansion survey and wrote to the Airports Authority of India (AAI) in this regard. Following this, a team of AAI Officials visited the airport in May 2015 for feasibility study and identification of land required.

In 2019, the team visited the adjacent area of the airport and identified the land for expanding the runway from 1,370 to 1,920 m (4,490 to 6,300 ft). However, this proposed expansion would require a total of 140 ha (350 acres) and would mean displacement of almost all of the Gaggal Township which is located about 2 km (1.2 mi) from the Airport and lies directly in the proposed path of airstrip expansion. As a result, in January and February 2020, there were demonstrations by the locals against the government.

In March 2021, an Obstruction Level Survey (OLS) for proposed expansion was carried out by AAI. In March 2022, AAI came up with a two phase expansion plan for Kangra Airport.

- In Phase 1, the runway is to be expanded by around 600 m (2,000 ft), from current 1,372 to 1,900 m (4,501 to 6,234 ft), which would require construction of a runway bridge over the Manjhi River, just short of Gaggal township. If first phase is completed, it will help turboprop airplanes in taking off and landing at the Gaggal airport with full capacity without load penalty.
- In Phase 2, the runway is to be increased by 1,110 m (3,640 ft), taking the increased length of runway from 1,900 to 3,010 m (6,230 to 9,880 ft). This expansion will enable narrow bodied turbofan aircraft like Airbus A320 and Boeing 737 to easily operate from this airport. This would not only provide a major boost to the tourism sector for Kangra district, but would also serve Chamba, Hamirpur and Una districts as well as adjoining areas of Punjab such as Pathankot, which despite having an airport, does not have any regular flights .

In November 2022, CWPRS, Pune was consulted to study the feasibility of constructing runway bridge over Manjhi River, which gave its nod in this regard in a report submitted to state Government in February 2023. Meanwhile, after State Assembly elections and formation of new Government in December 2022, Kangra District was identified to be developed as Tourism Capital of the state. Consequently, the expansion of Kangra Airport got a new impetus. Further, it was also decided to complete the land acquisition process for both phases simultaneously. In this regard, in March 2023, the Social Impact Assessment of the expansion project was ordered by the Government to be carried by Himachal Pradesh Institute of Public Administration(HIPA). In order to complete the land acquisition proceedings and start the expansion work as soon as possible, the State Government in Budget 2023-24 allocated Rs 2000 Crore for this purpose. In April 2023, under the provisions of Land Acquisition Act-2013, an Expert Appraisal Committee(EAC) was constituted under the chairmanship of Deputy Commissioner(Relief and Rehabilitation), Raja ka Talab, to study the SIA report. The EAC will submit its recommendations to Government regarding the relief and compensation to be provided to the displaced population in the expansion project. In May 2023 the EAC in its meeting discussed the various issues regarding expansion of Airport and also sought Techno-feasibility report as well as Environment Impact Assessment report from the Government. In June 2023, in a Cabinet meeting, the State Government gave approval for land acquisition in this regard. In July 2023, the Notification to acquire the said land was issued by Government under Section 11 of Land Acquisition Act-2013.

== Airlines and destinations ==
Airlines	Destinations
Alliance Air	Shimla
IndiGo	Chandigarh, Delhi, Jaipur, Noida

== Awards and recognition ==
In 2024, Kangra Airport was ranked First in the AAI's Customer Satisfaction Survey-2024 in domestic airports category.
