= Shimla Airport =

Airport serving Shimla, Himachal Pradesh, India

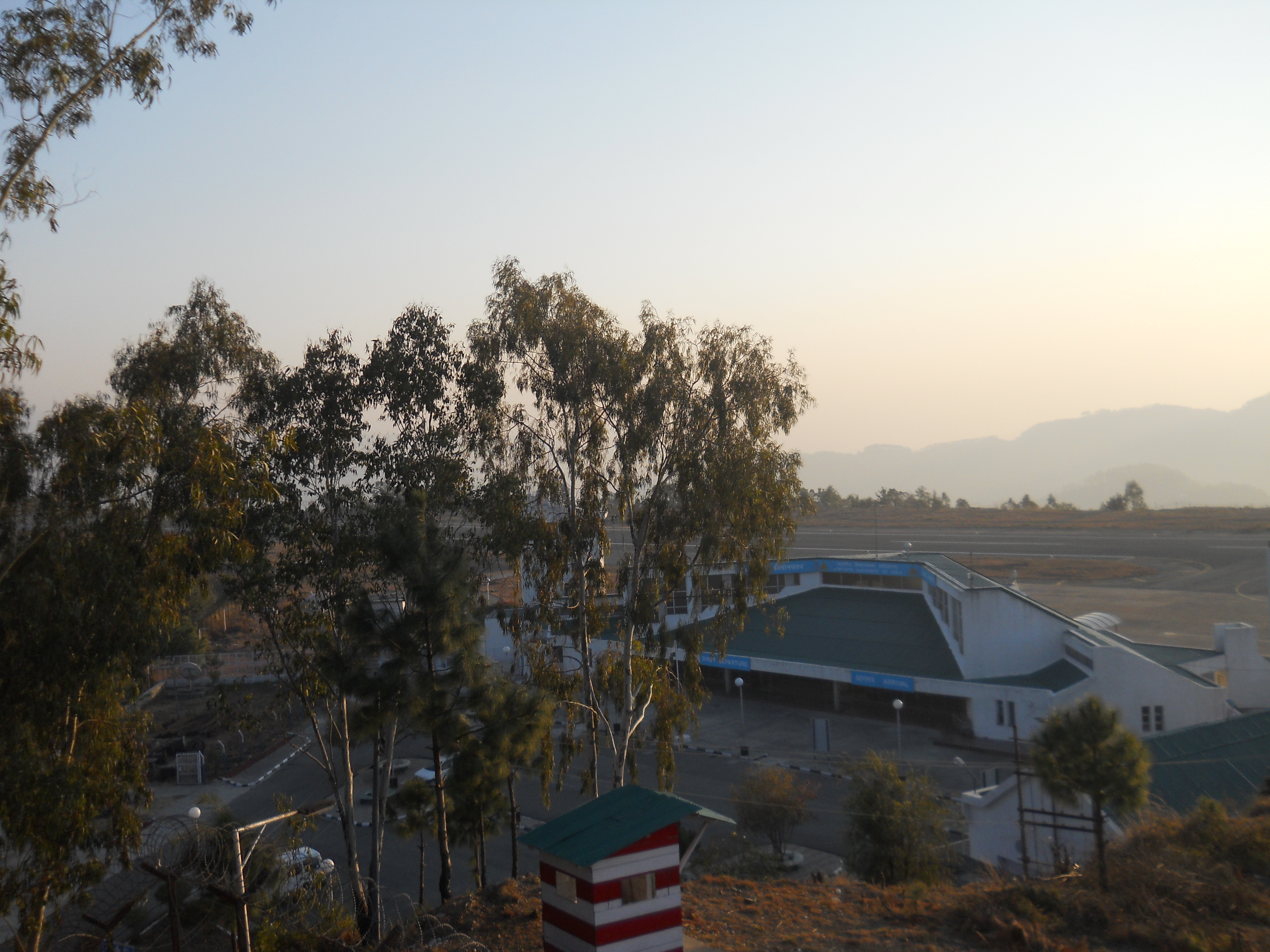
- IATA: SLV; ICAO: VISM

Summary
- Airport type: Public
- Owner: Government of India
- Operator: Airports Authority of India
- Serves: Shimla
- Location: Jubbarhatti, Shimla, Himachal Pradesh, India
- Elevation AMSL: 1,546 m (5,072 ft)
- Coordinates: 31°4′54″N 77°4′5″E
- Website: Shimla Airport

Map
- Location of the airport in Himachal Pradesh SLV (India)

Runways
Direction	Length		Surface
Direction	m	ft	Surface
14/32	1,230	4,035	Asphalt

Statistics (April 2025 – March 2026)
- Passengers: 8052 (▼ -68.4%)
- Aircraft movements: 393 (▼ -66.3%)
- Cargo tonnage: 0 ( 0%)
- Source: AAI

Shimla Airport (IATA: SLV, ICAO: VISM) is a regional airport located in Jubbarhatti, 22 kilometres (14 mi) from Shimla, in the state of Himachal Pradesh, India. Kingfisher Airlines used to operate the sole daily flight from Delhi, but could not carry more than 28 passengers on its return journey because of load restrictions imposed on the aircraft due to Shimla's high altitude. It ceased operations to Shimla in September 2012.

On 27 April 2017, commercial services were resumed by Alliance Air but then suspended it in March 2020 because of the COVID-19 pandemic. The airline was expected to resume the service from 15 August 2022, but was delayed again due to some problems with the airline. The airline finally resumed the flight service to Delhi on 26 September 2022. Alongside the airline, helicopter service is also provided by Pawan Hans.

== Airlines and destinations ==
Airlines	Destinations
Alliance Air	Delhi, Dharamshala
