= Dhankar =

Dhankhar may refer to:

- Dhankhar, an Indian surname
  - Jagdeep Dhankhar, Vice President of India from 2022 to 2025
- Dhankar Gompa, a monastery in Spiti, India
- Dhankar Lake, a lake in Spiti Valley, Himachal Pradesh, India
- Dhankar Village, in Himachal Pradesh, India
