= Dhankar Village =

- village
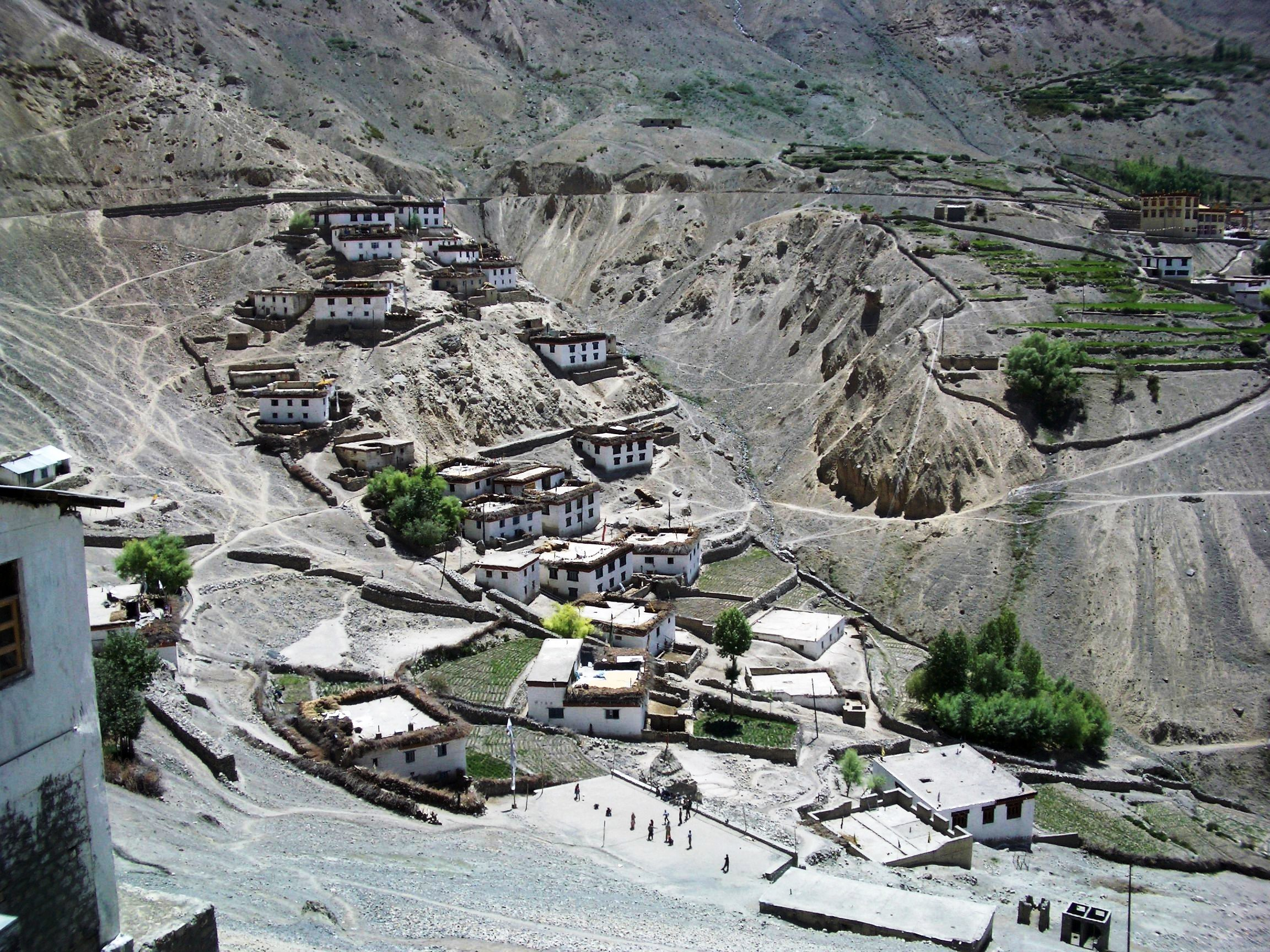
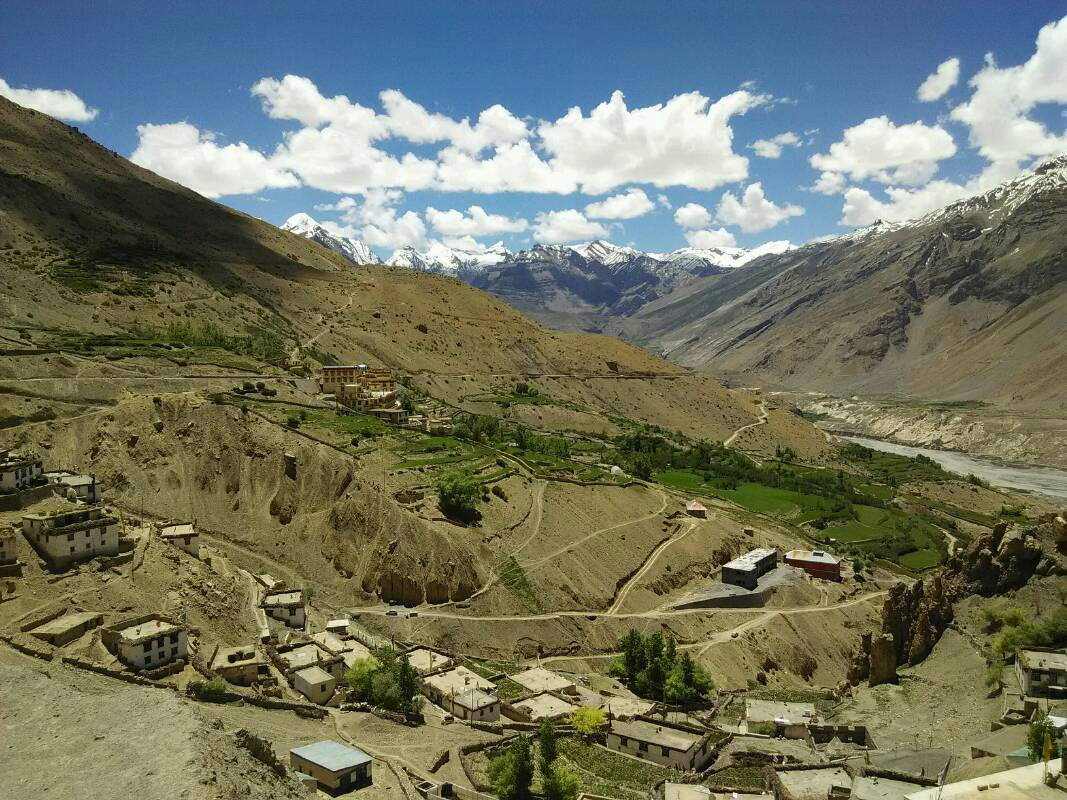
- Dhankar Village, 2004. Dhankar village in July 2015

- Location within Himachal Pradesh Location within India
- Coordinates: 32°08′N 78°13′E
- Country: India
- State: Himachal Pradesh
- District: Lahaul and Spiti
- Elevation: 3,894 m (12,776 ft)

Population (2011)
  - Total: 301

Languages
  - Official: Hindi
- Time zone: UTC+5:30 (IST)
- Climate: Dsb

Dhankar Village (also Dankhar, Drangkhar; Brang-mkhar or Grang-mkhar) is a large high village which used to be the capital of the Spiti Valley in Himachal Pradesh, India. It is at an altitude of 3,894 metres (12,774 feet) above sea level, between the towns of Tabo and Kaza, Himachal Pradesh. Above the village sits the local monastery - the Dhankar Gompa. Total number of houses are 68. The 40th head of the Gelug school of Tibetan Buddhism, Pelden Gyeltshen (1601-1674), came from Dhankar.

== Description ==
The mountaineer and explorer Harish Kapadia describes Dhankar as following:

Dankhar (3870 m.) the old capital of Spiti is a large village built on a spur or bluff which stands out into the main valley and ends in a precipice. It rises 300 m above the river. It stands above Sichling on the left bank of the Spiti river which is wide here. There may perhaps once have been a fort here, but no trace of it was seen except for what seemed to be a large house on the top of the hill. Dankhar was capital of Spiti for many years till needs of the modern day saw the capital shifted to Kaja Kaza. Situated on the ridge it would have been very easy to defend this place. I was told stories about how the lamas sat in the monastery or the upper houses throwing stones at invaders. Life was very simple before the days of bullets! The whole place is very picturesque. As I approached it, I could see its corridors cut in the rock face leading to various chambers which are either used as store rooms for the villagers or as rest-houses for the travellers. There are seven tiers of houses built along the slope. . . . Now it is connected by a rough, motorable road and is 27 km from Kaja. Towards the west of it is the Pin Valley.

== Demographics ==
Dhankhar is a medium size village located in Spiti of Lahul and Spiti district, Himachal Pradesh with total 68 families residing. The Dhankhar village has population of 301 of which 152 are males while 149 are females as per Population Census 2011.

In Dhankhar village population of children with age 0-6 is 44 which makes up 14.62% of total population of village. Average Sex Ratio of Dhankhar village is 980 which is higher than Himachal Pradesh state average of 972. Child Sex Ratio for the Dhankhar as per census is 2143, higher than Himachal Pradesh average of 909.

Dhankhar village has lower literacy rate compared to Himachal Pradesh. In 2011, literacy rate of Dhankhar village was 77.43% compared to 82.80% of Himachal Pradesh. In Dhankhar Male literacy stands at 84.78% while female literacy rate was 68.91%.

As per the constitution of India and Panchyati Raaj Act, Dhankhar village is administered by a Sarpanch (Head of Village) who is an elected representative of the village.

== Gallery ==
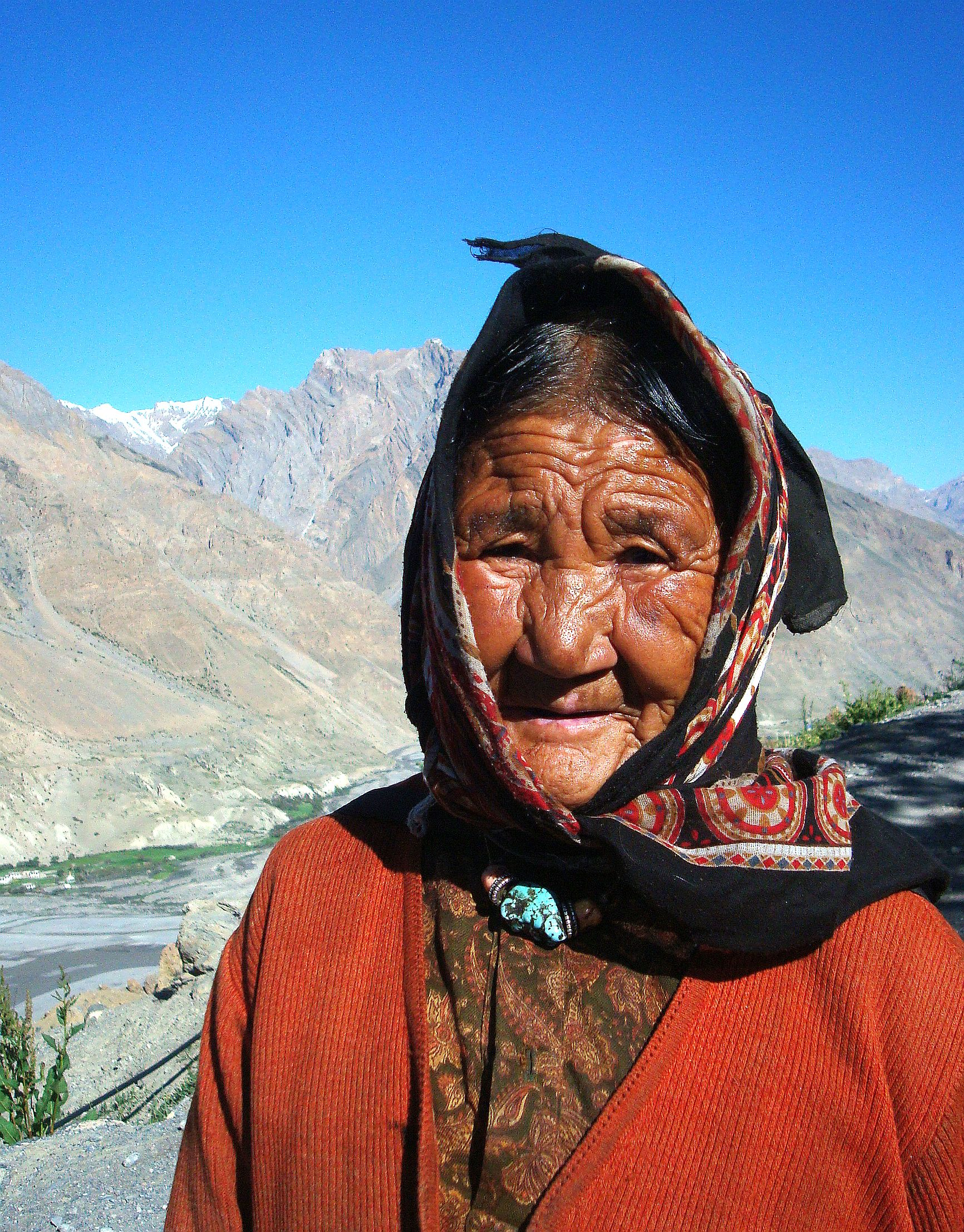
Lady at Dhankar village, Spiti Valley, Himachal Pradesh

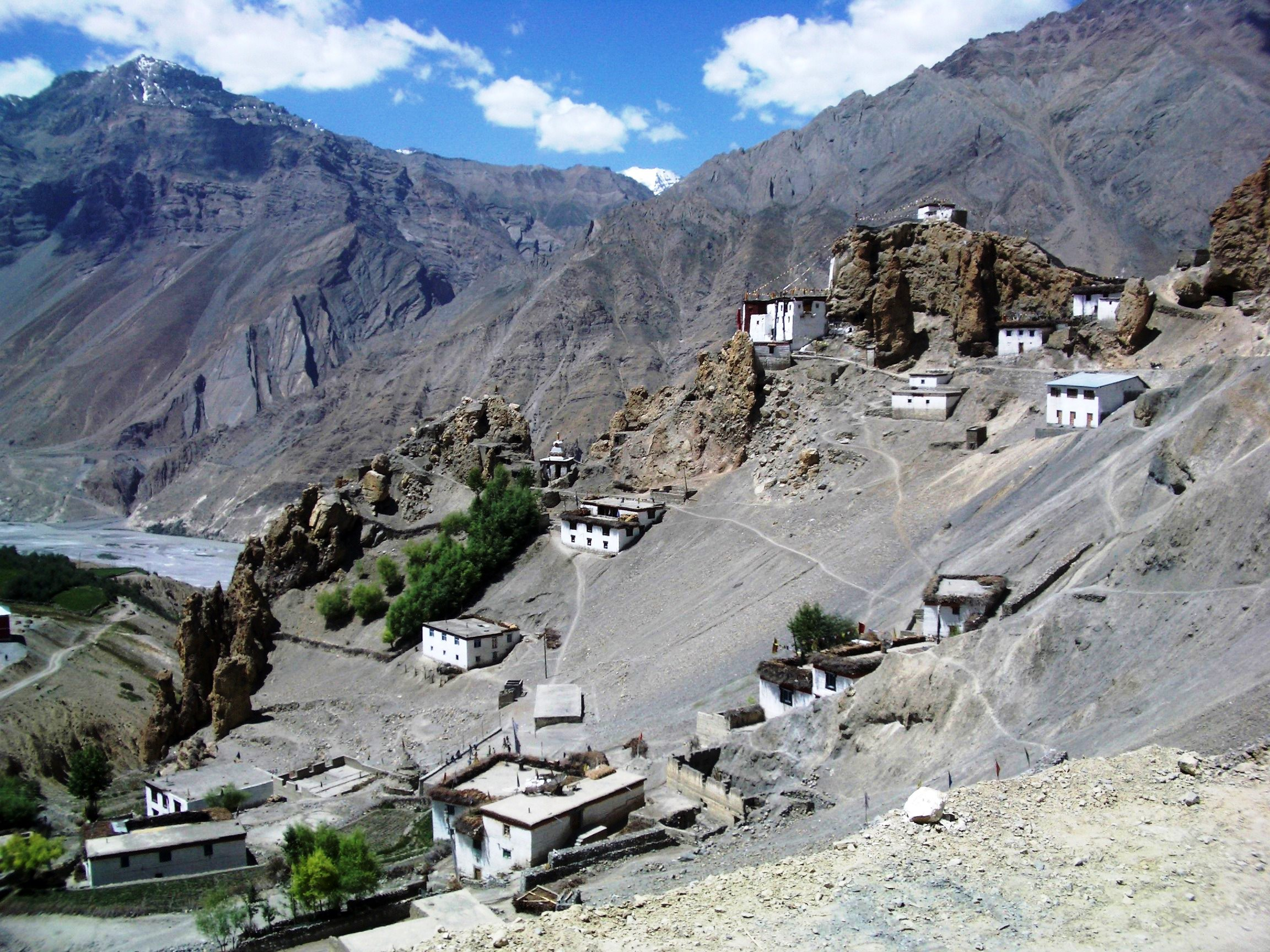
Dhankar village & Gompa

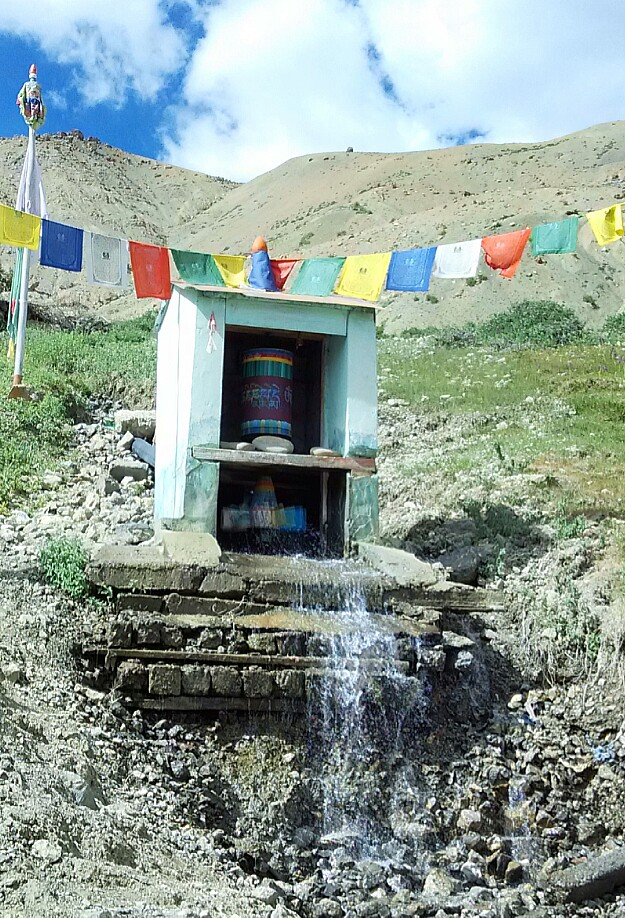
Water Driven Prayer Wheel at Dhankar

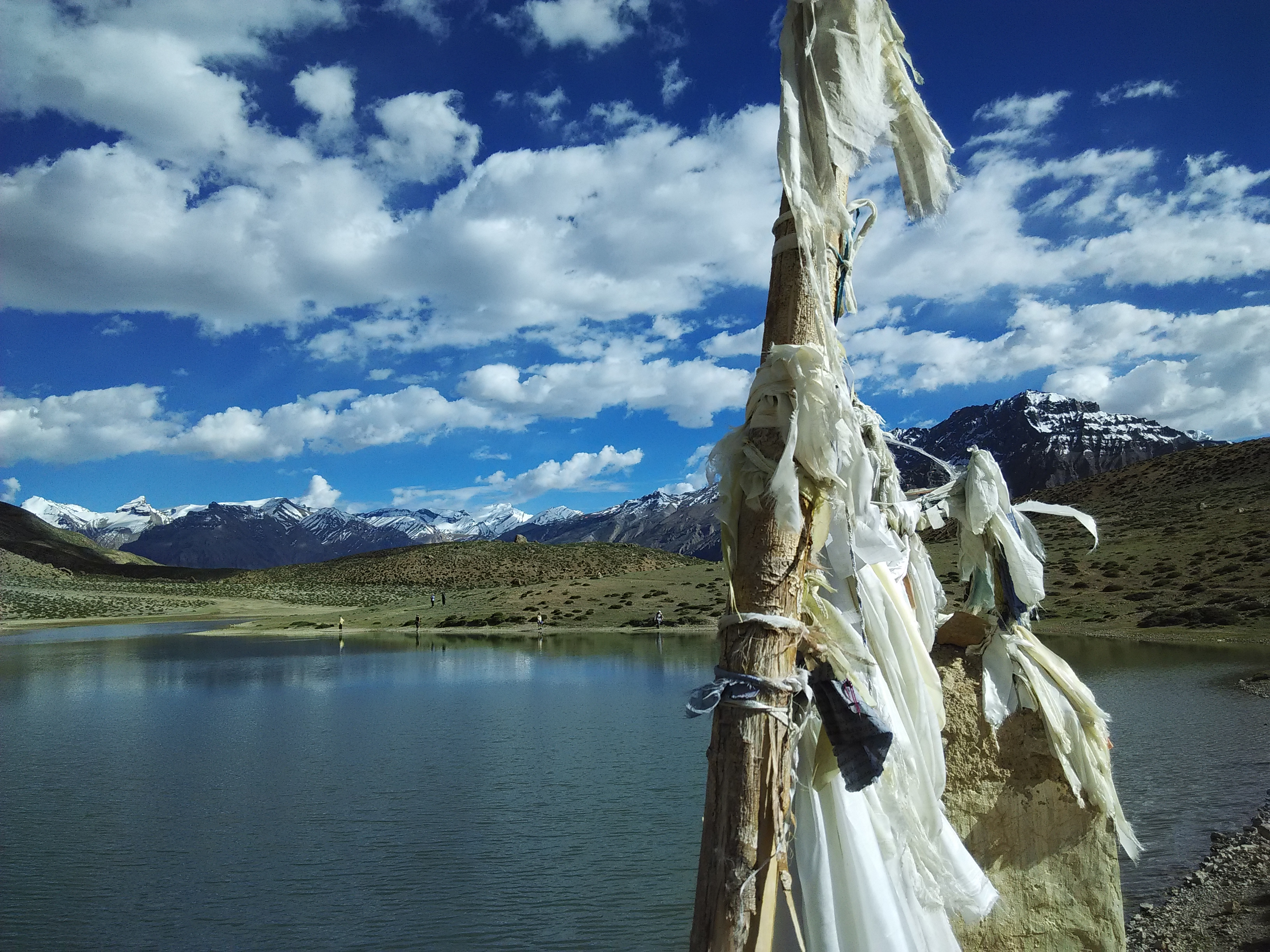
Dhankar lake and Manerang range above Dhankar village in Spiti valley, Himachal Pradesh

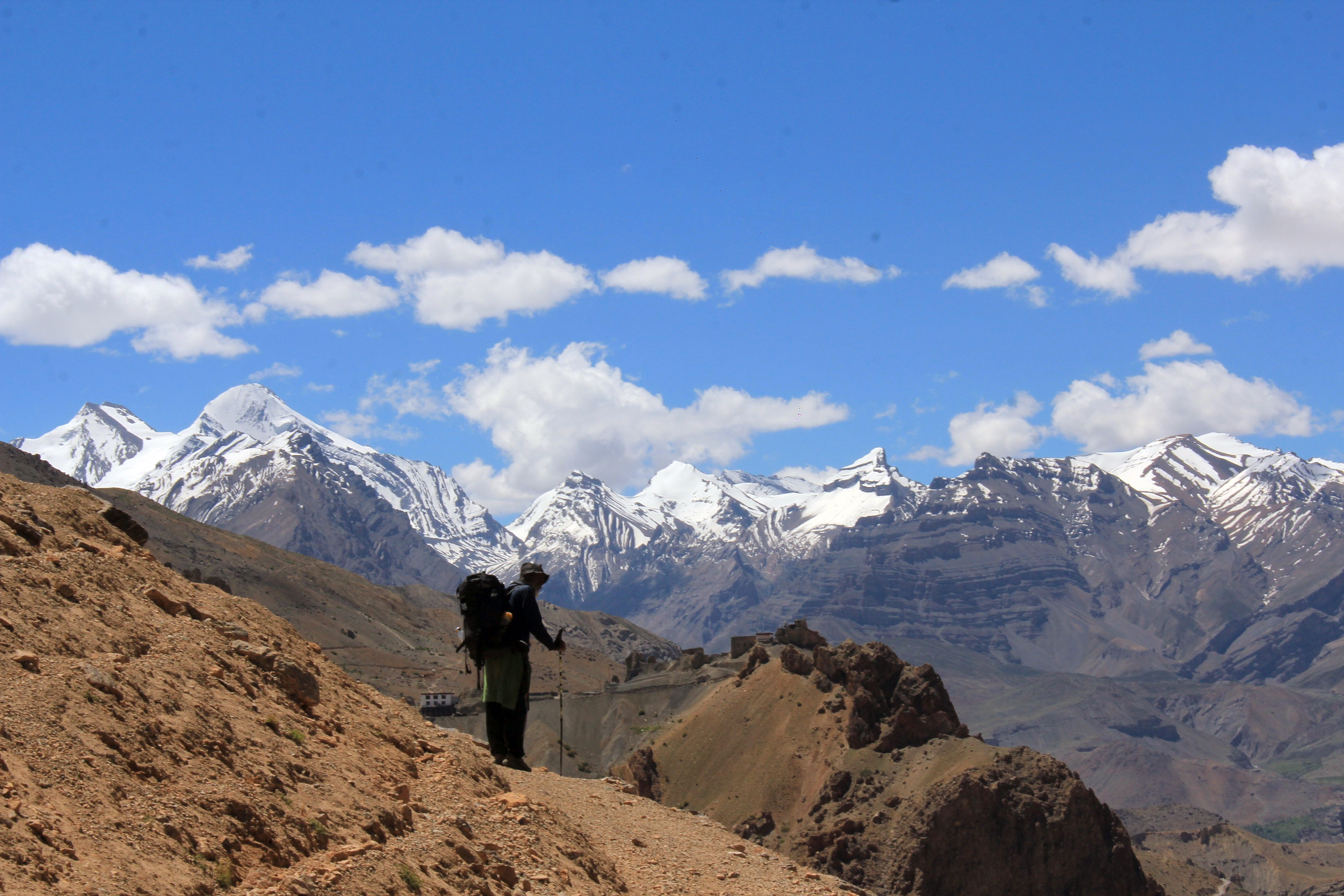
Near Dhankar village, during Spiti left bank Trek-beautiful Manerang range on backdrop

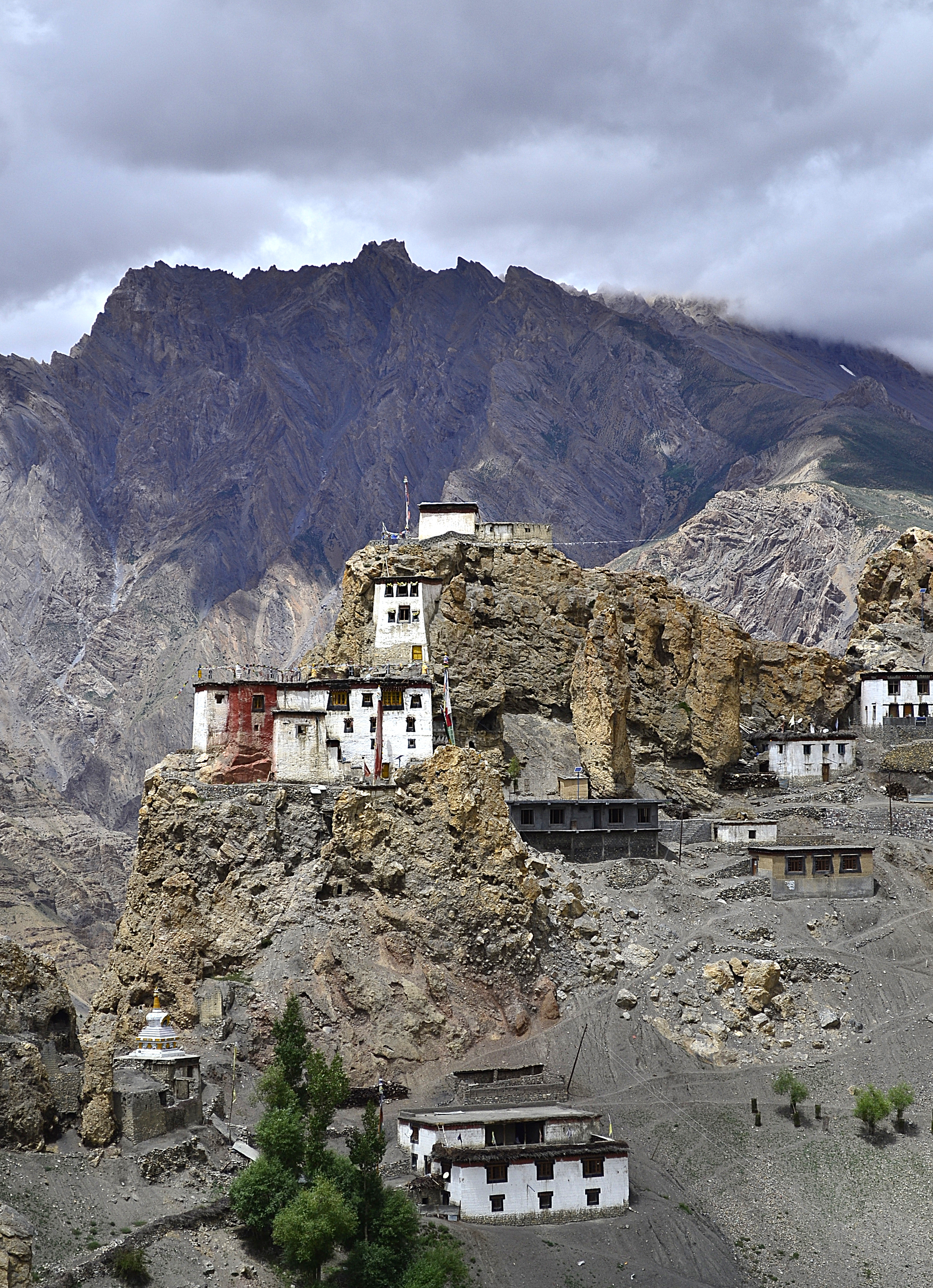
Dhankar Gompa
