= Dhankar Gompa =

Village and Gompa in India

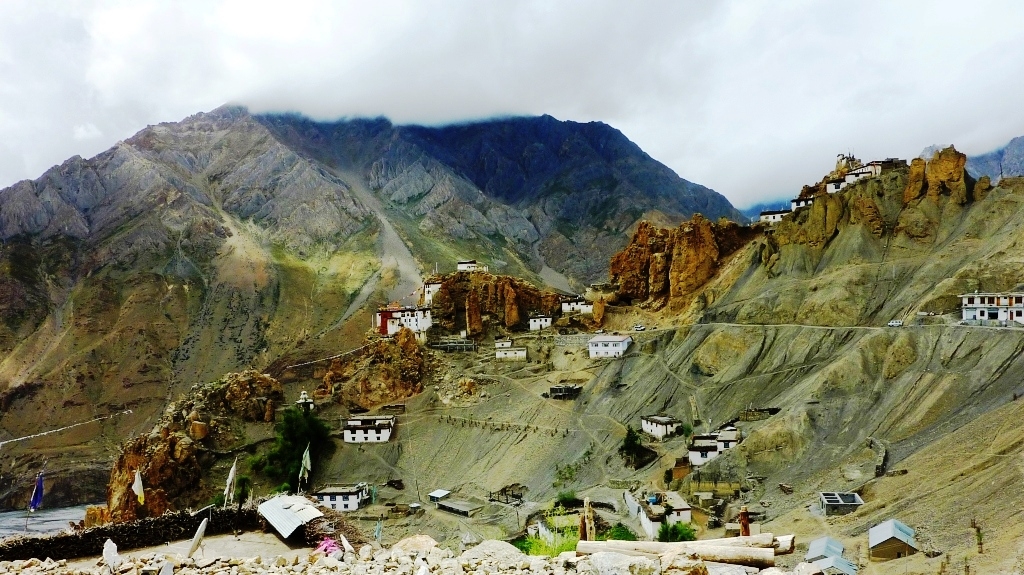
- Dhankar Gompa

- Location within India

Religion
- Affiliation: Tibetan Buddhism
- Sect: Gelug
- Leadership: The Fourteenth Dalai Lama

Location
- Location: Himachal Pradesh, India
- Country: India
- Coordinates: 32°05′26″N 78°12′43″E

Architecture
- Style: Gompa
- Established: 12th century

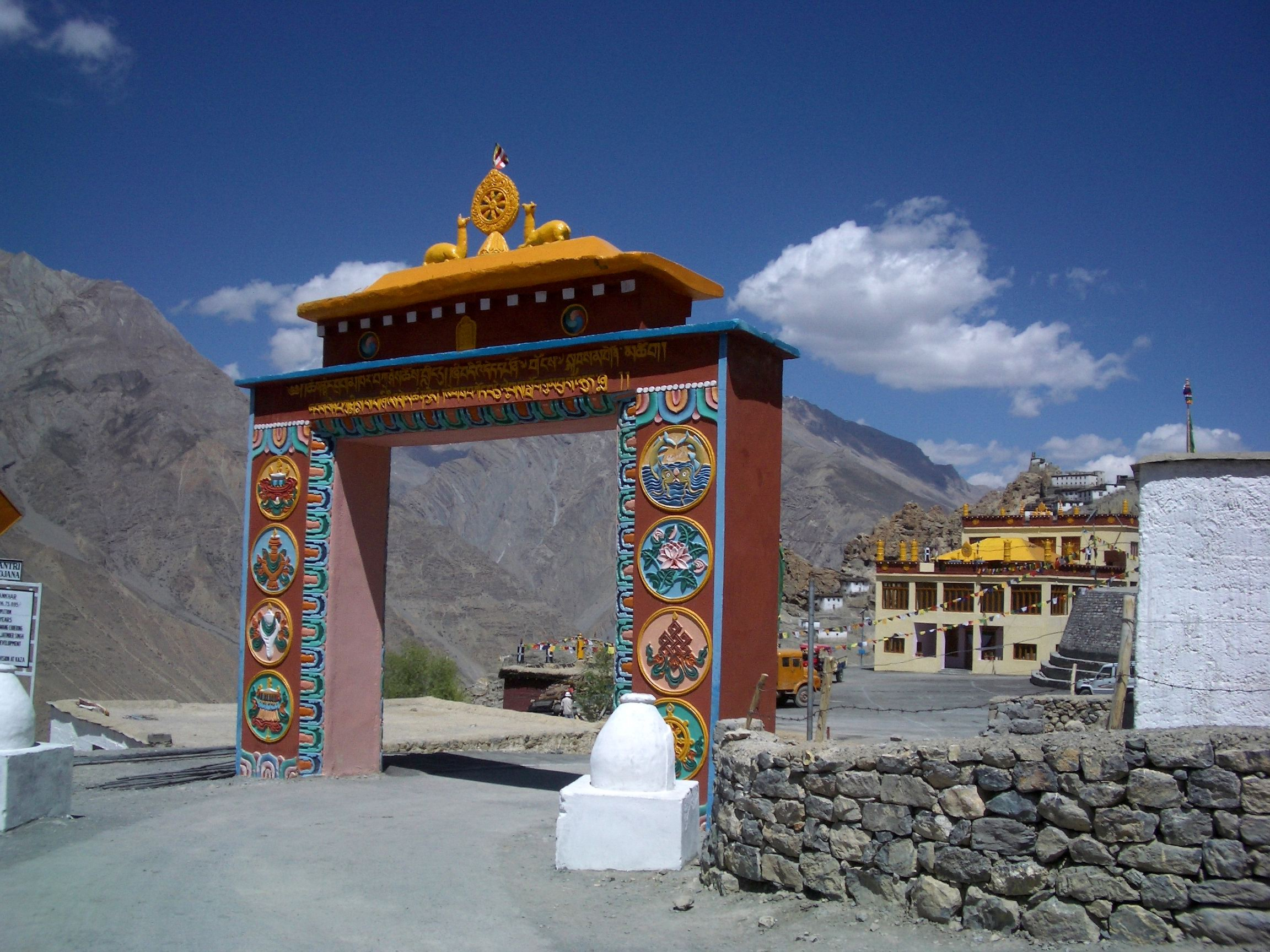
Dhankar Gompa Gate

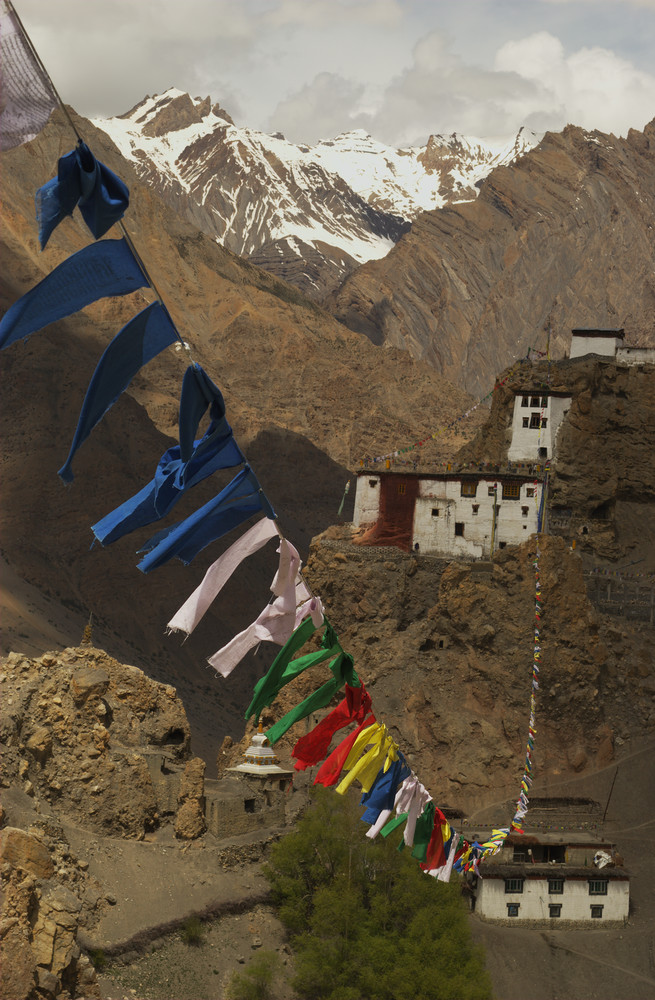
Prayer flags in Dhankar

Dhankar Gompa (also Dankhar, Drangkhar or Dhangkar Gompa; Brang-mkhar or Grang-mkhar) is a village and also a Gompa, a Buddhist temple in the district of Lahaul and Spiti in India. It is situated at an elevation of 3,894 metres (12,774 feet) in the Spiti Valley above Dhankar Village, between the towns of Kaza and Tabo. The complex is built on a 1000-foot (300-metre) high spur overlooking the confluence of the Spiti and Pin Rivers - one of the world's most spectacular settings for a gompa. Dhang or dang means cliff, and kar or khar means fort. Hence Dhangkar means fort on a cliff.

Dhankar, like Key Monastery and Tangyud Monastery in Spiti, and Thiksey, Likir and Rangdum monasteries in Ladakh, was built as a fort monastery on the Central Tibetan pattern. It was reported to have had 90 monks in 1855.

== Overview ==
Below the Gompa lies the small village of Shichilling which contains the new Dhankar Monastery, home to about 150 monks belonging to the Gelug school of Tibetan Buddhism.

Beyond the surrounding harsh, lunar landscape, notable sights at Dhankar Gompa include a statue of Vairocana consisting of four figures seated back-to-back, in addition to various crumbling thangkas. There is a small museum in the gompa. In 2006, World Monuments Fund selected Dhankar gompa as one of the 100 most endangered sites in the world. A nonprofit group, Dhangkar Initiative, is attempting to organize its conservation.

Dhankar is approachable by a motorable road, good for small vehicles only, that branches off for Dhankar from the main Kaza-Samdu road at a point around 24 km from Kaza. The branch road is 8 km in length up to Dhankar.

== History ==
Dhankar was the traditional capital of the Spiti Valley Kingdom during the 17th century and has some features dating back to the 12th century. It was the seat of the early rulers of Spiti, the Nonos, who had the right to cultivate the government lands nearby and were required to keep the fort in repair. They also dispensed justice to the people and were noted for their harsh penalties until the British replaced them.

The monastery is also referred to as Lhaöpé Gönpa (Wylie: lha 'od pa'i dgon pa):

Lha-'od seems to be the local pronunciation of Zla-'od, the name of a famous lama who was born in 1121, according to the Reu-mig. Zla-'od-pa would then mean "a follower of Zla-'od." He is apparently the founder or renovator of the monastery which now belongs to the Gelugpa order. The monks assert that it was not only of earlier origin than the Tabo monastery, but also earlier than Srong-btsan-sgam-po. They have, however, nothing to show of any really ancient relics. They explain this fact by stating that the monastery was plundered many times, lastly during the Dōgrā war [...]

A new Teaching Temple was inaugurated by the Fourteenth Dalai Lama on 12 July 2009.

== Gallery ==
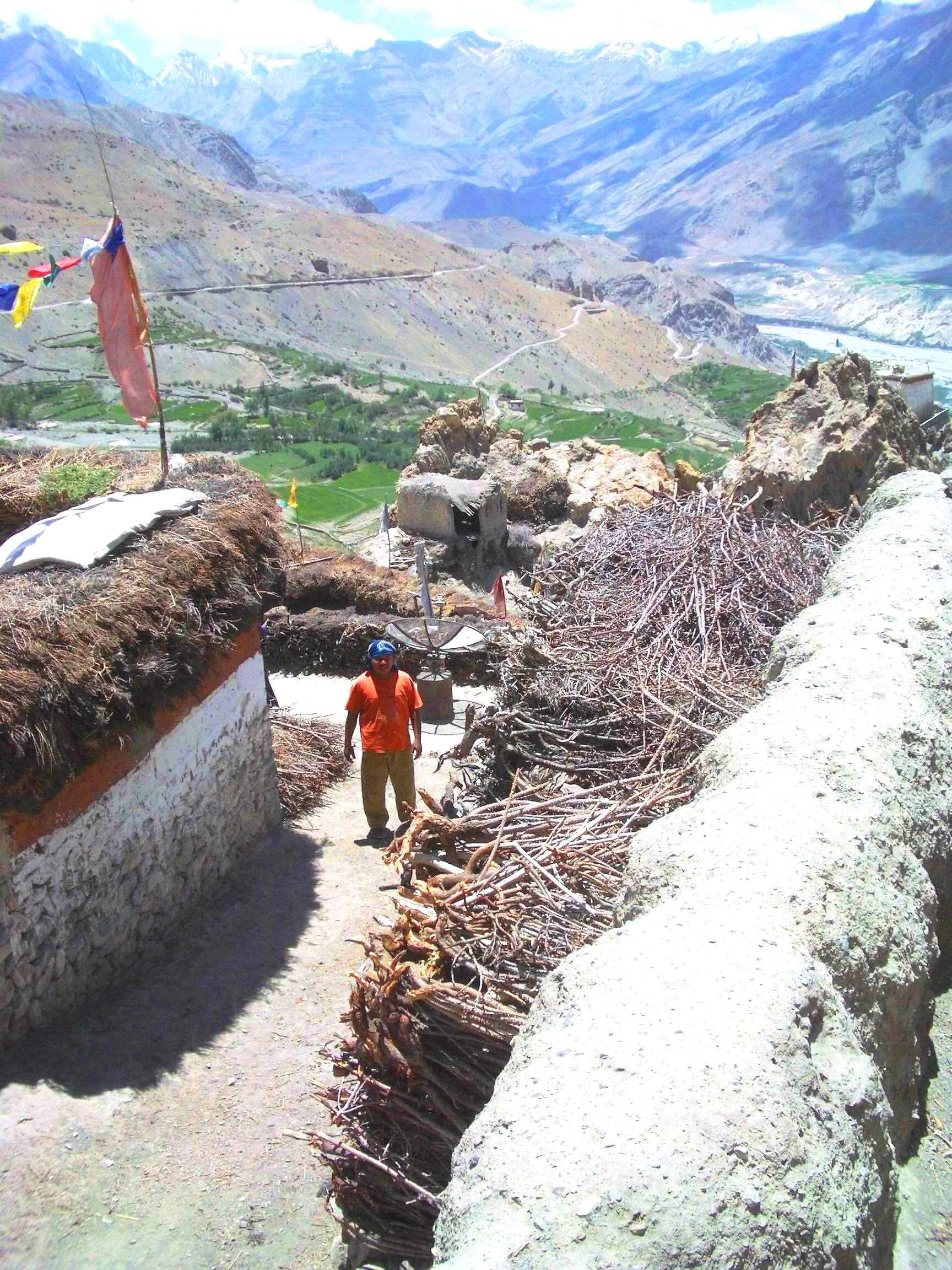
View down Spiti Valley from roof of Dhankar Gompa

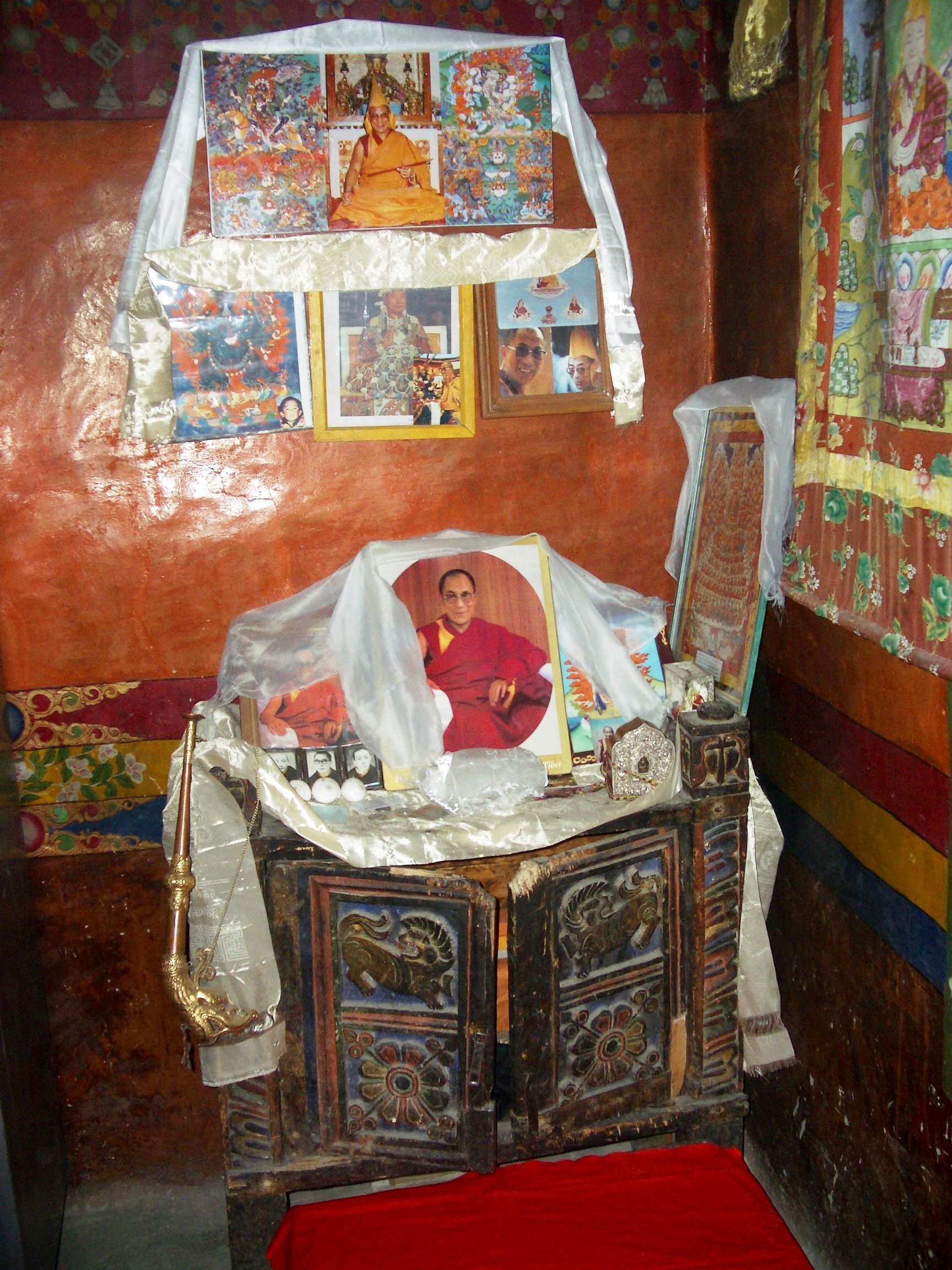
Small shrine honouring the 14th Dalai Lama. Dhankar Gompa.

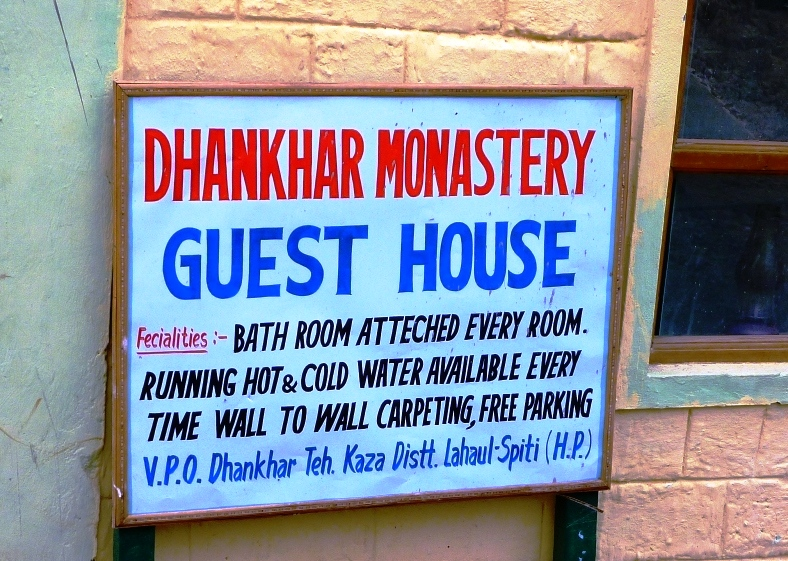
Dhankhar Monastery Guest House Sign. 2010

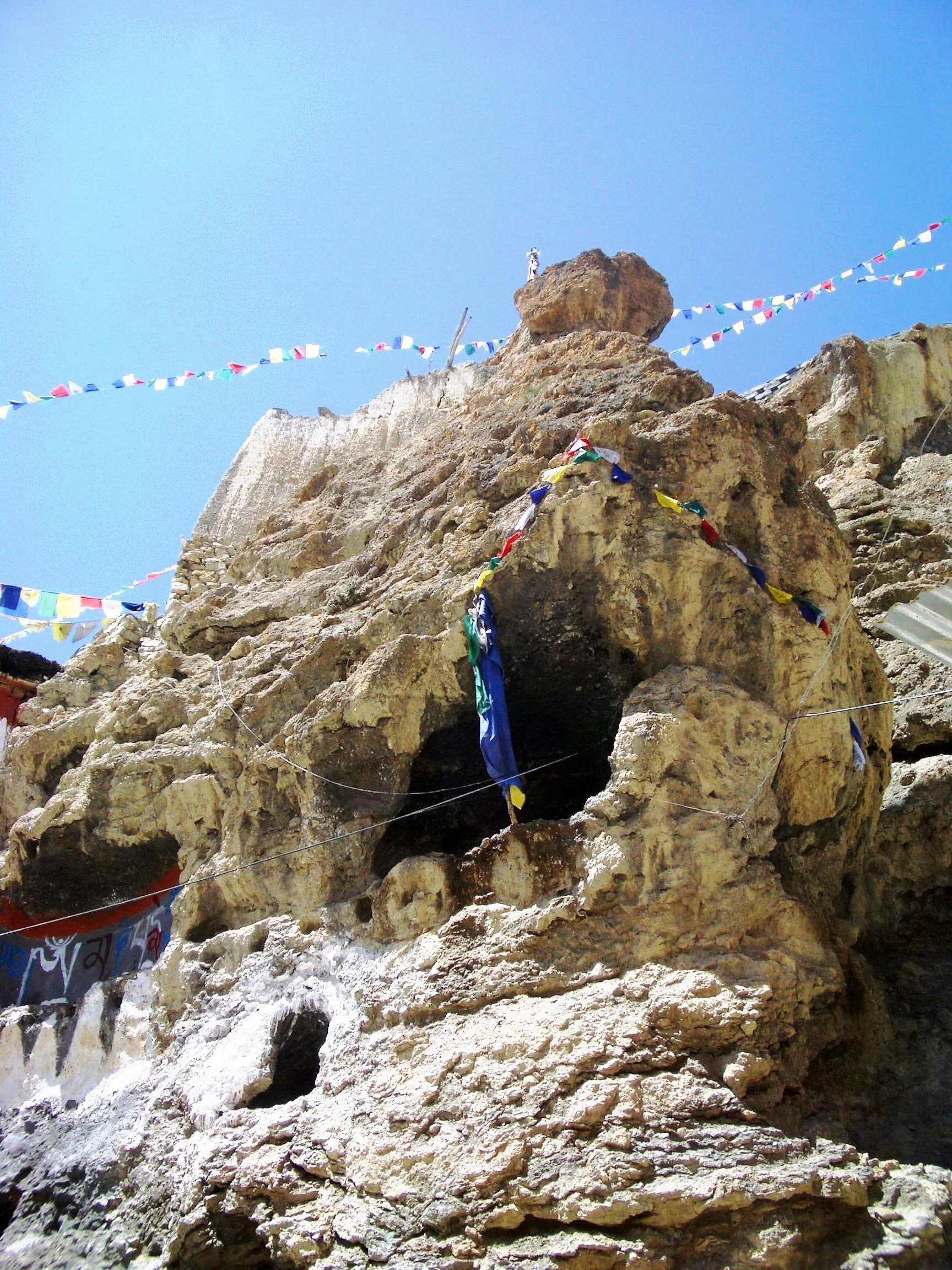
Meditation cave, Dhankhar Gompa. Lahaul and Spiti, India. 2004

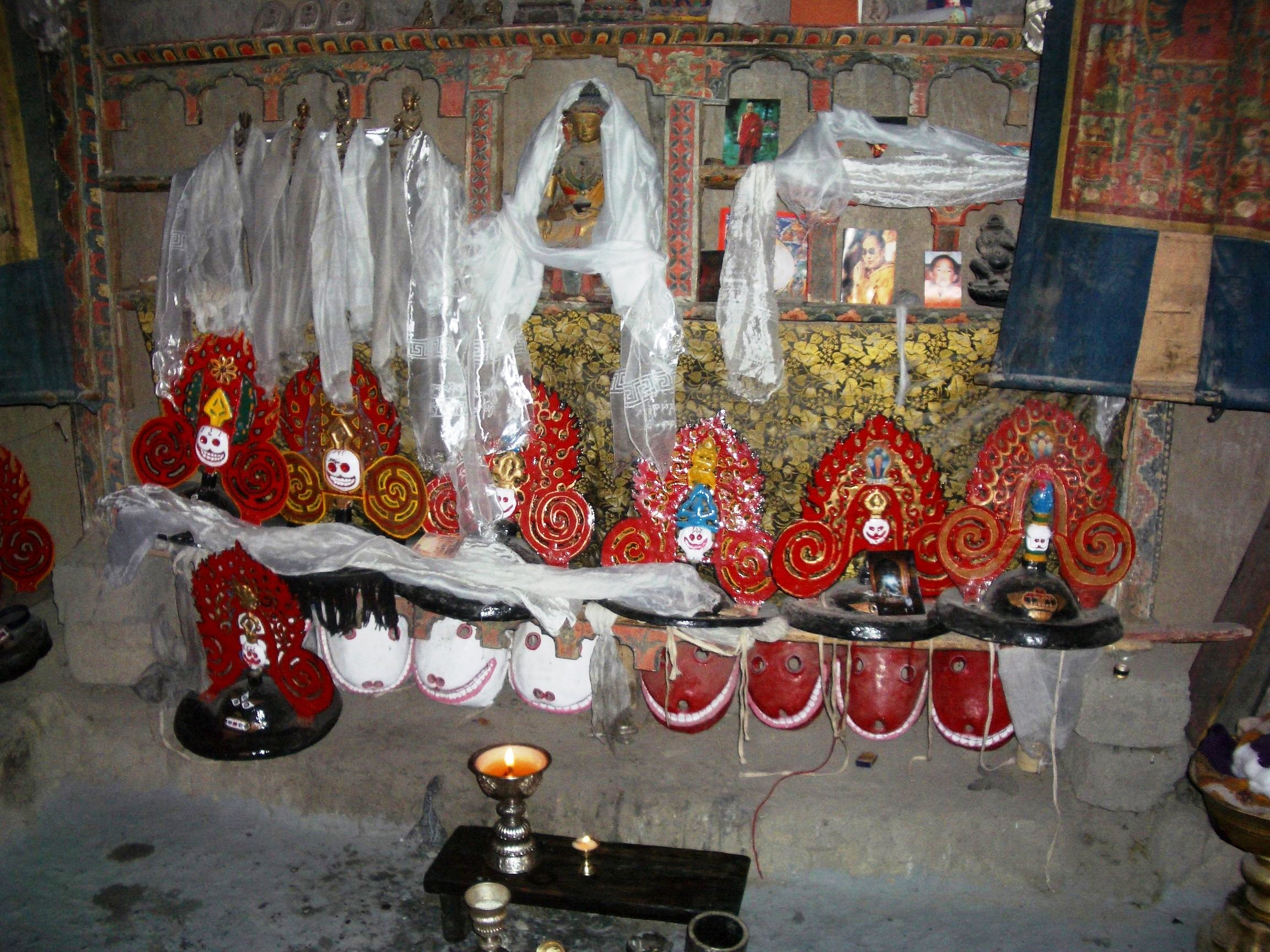
Sculptures, Dhankar Gompa

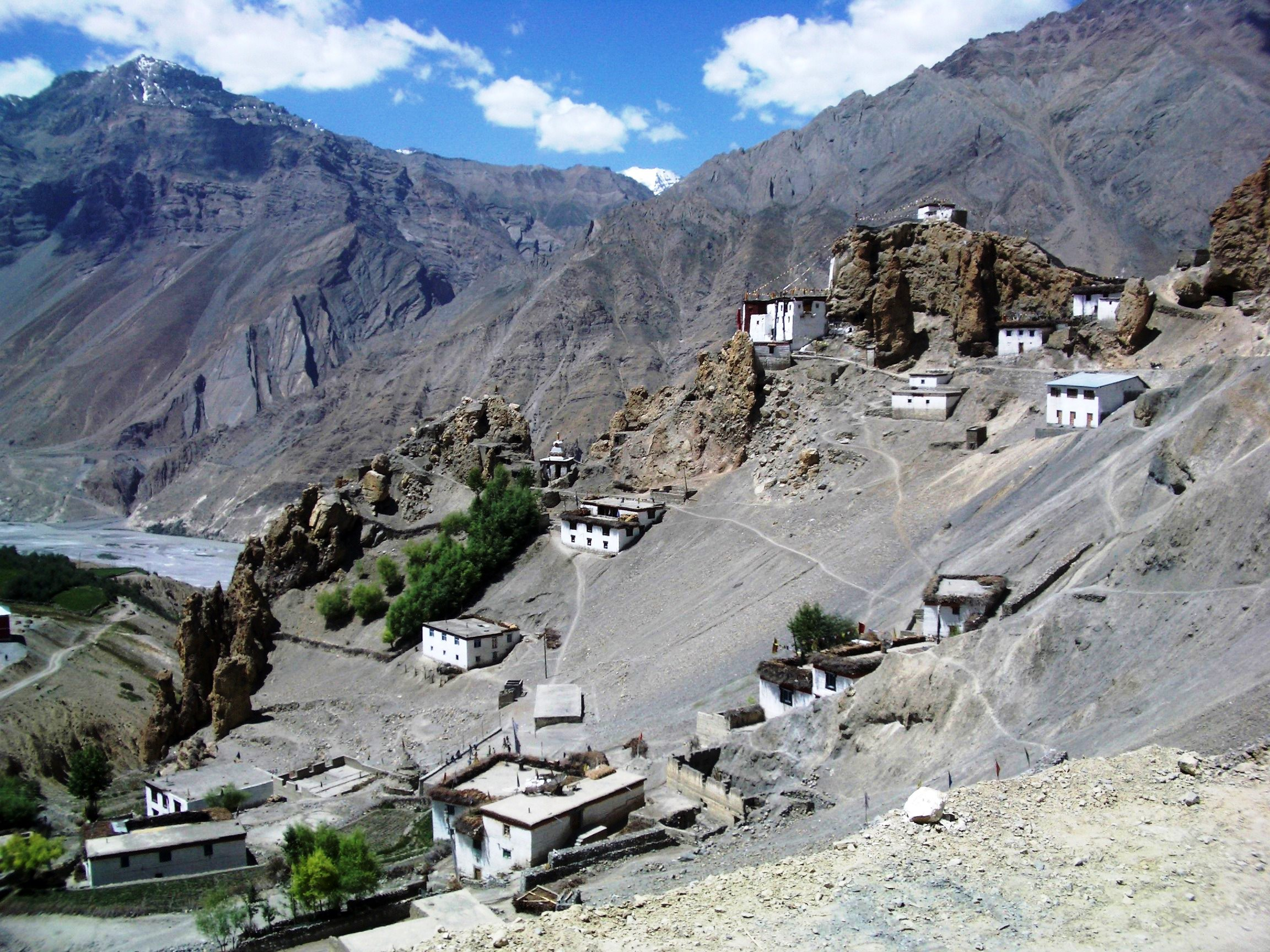
Dhankar village & Gompa

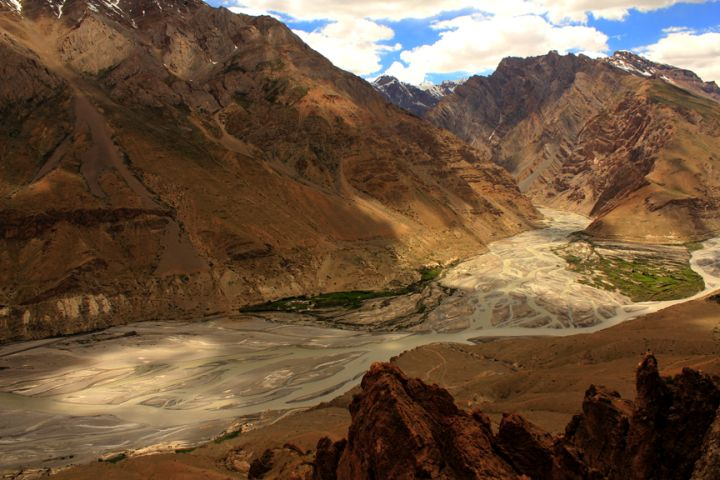
Confluence Of Spiti And Pin river and pin valley from Old Dhankar Monastery

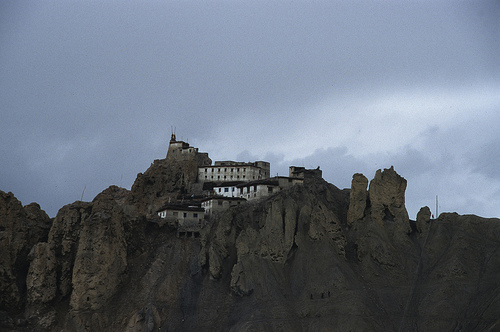
Dhankar gompa, Spiti

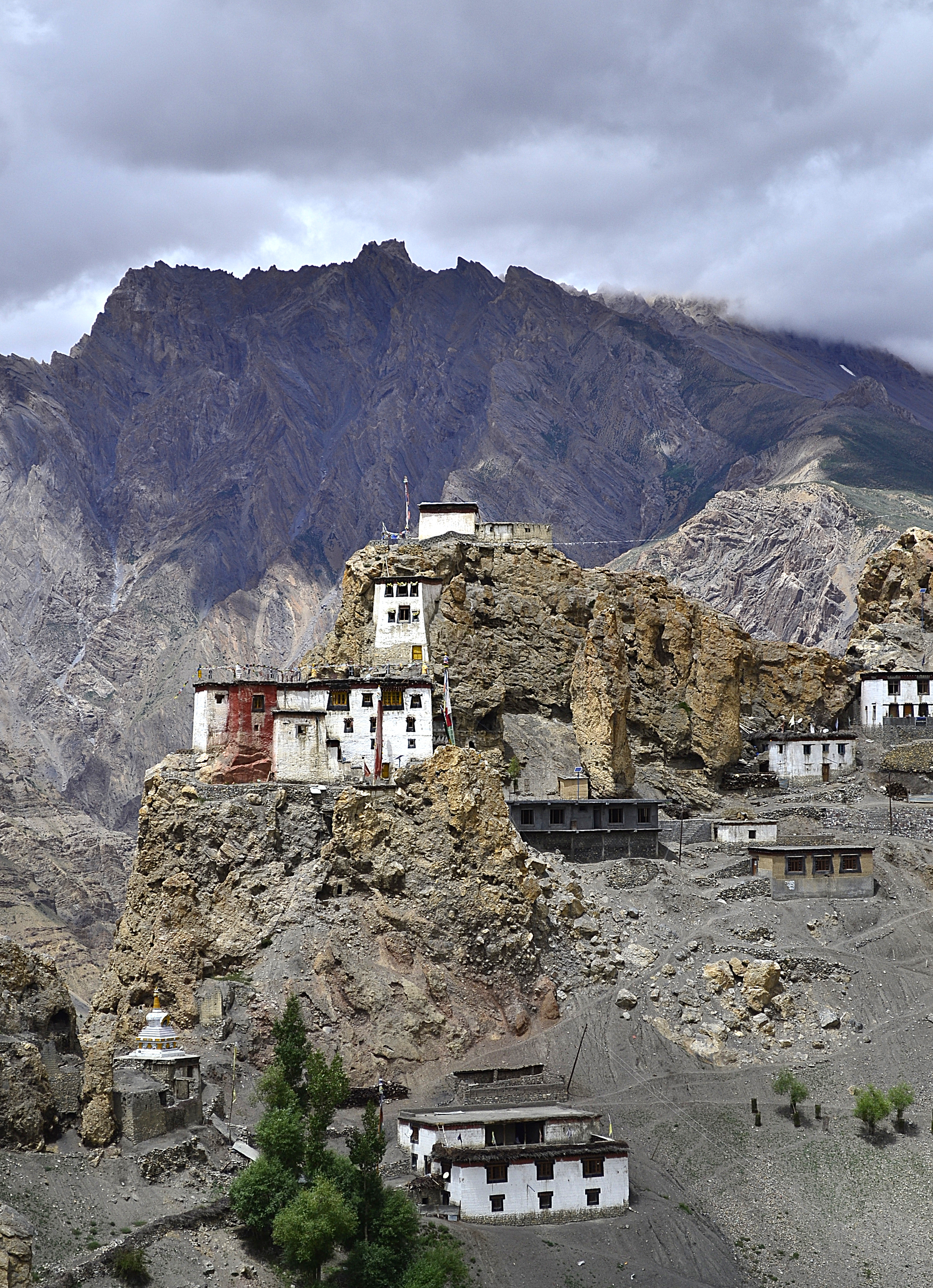
Dhankar Gompa
