= Pelden Gyeltshen =

40th Ganden Tripa

Pelden Gyeltshen (Wylie: dga' ldan khri pa 40 dpal ldan rgyal mtshan) (1601–1674) was the 40th Ganden Tripa.

== Early life and education ==
Pelden Gyeltshen was born in village Dangkhar, the then capital of the Spiti valley (in present-day Himachal Pradesh, India). Pelden Gyeltsen went to Lhasa for his monastic education, where he studied at Ngari Dratsang and the Gyume College.

== Monastic career ==
Afterwards, he served as a teacher at the Gyume and the Ganden Jangtse colleges, before he was appointed as the 40th Ganden Tripa. Ganden Tripa is the appointed head of the Gelug school of Tibetan Buddhism. Ganden Tripas serve a fixed term of seven years. Pelden Gyeltshen served his term as Ganden Tripa from 1655 till 1662. This makes him one of the Ganden Tripas who served during the rule of the Fifth Dalai Lama, who is credited with unifying Tibet under the rule of the Ganden Phodrang.

== Reliquary ==
After Pelden Gyeltshen's death, a silver chorten was installed as a reliquary for his remains at the Ganden monastery near Lhasa.
