= Dhankar Lake =

Lake in Himachal Pradesh, India

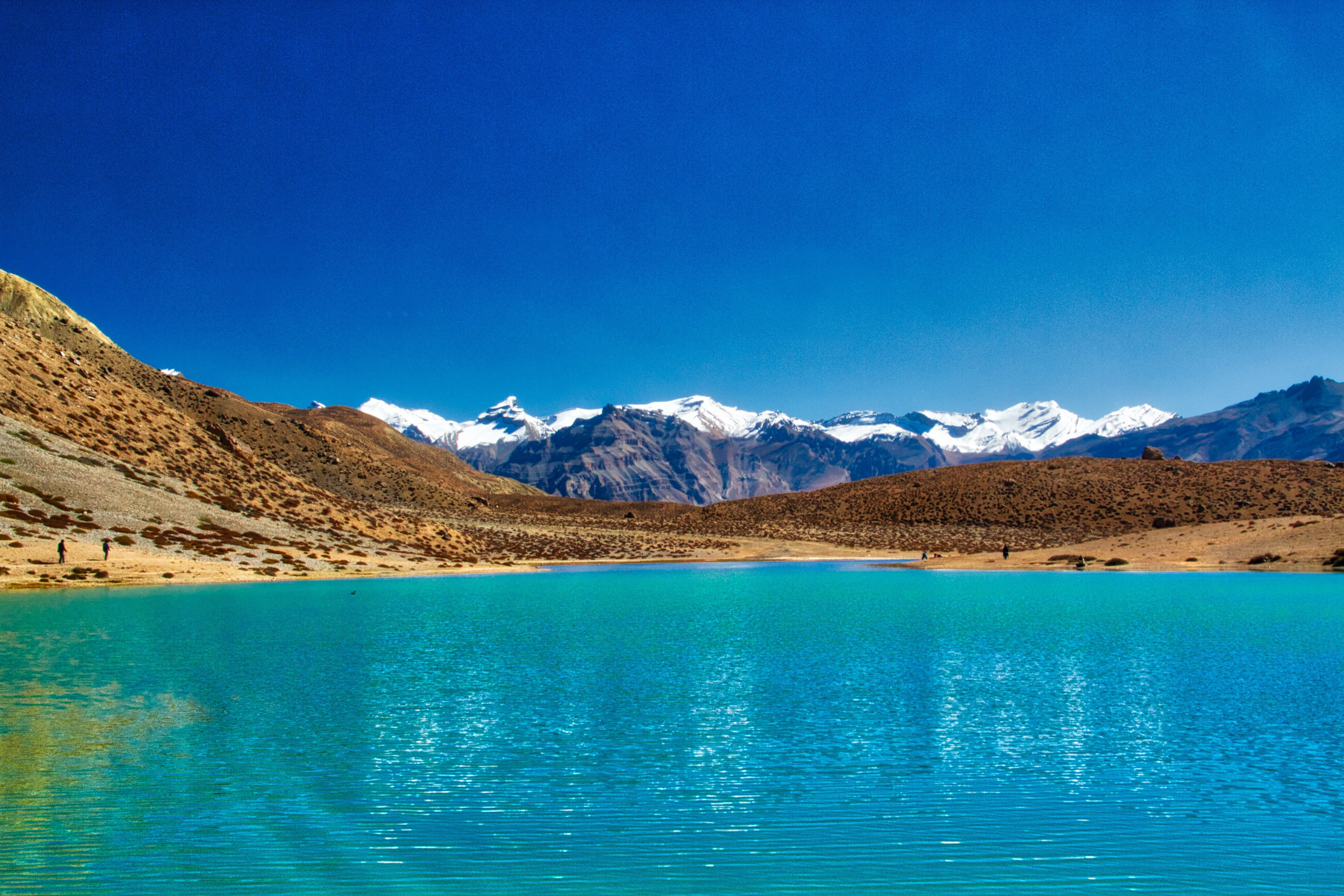
- Dhankar lake

- Location within Himachal Pradesh Location within India
- Location: Spiti district
- Coordinates: 32°05′23″N 78°13′41″E
- Type: High altitude lake
- Basin countries: India

Dhankar Lake is a high-altitude lake in Spiti Valley, in the Himachal Pradesh state of India. At an elevation of 4,140 metres (13,580 ft), it lies above the Dhankar monastery in the Lahaul-Spiti district and can be approached by a trek from the monastery.

== Other details ==
The lake is approximately 6 hours and 239 km from Manali. Temperatures in the area can drop as low as -14 during the winter. From 5 to 20 degrees is the average annual temperature.
