= Hikkim =

- village
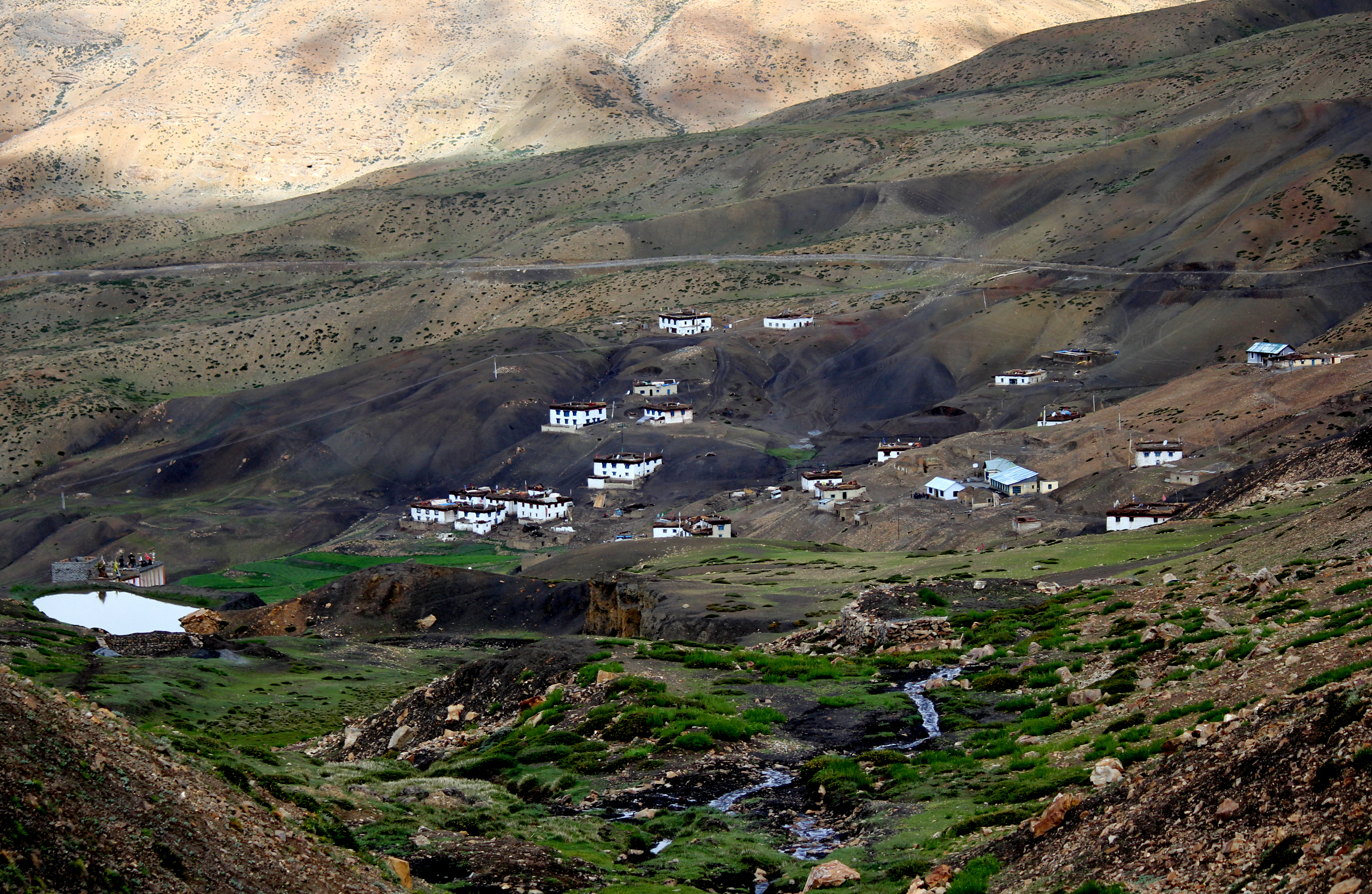
- Hikkim village and water reservoir used for irrigation

- Location in Himachal Pradesh, India Hikkim (India)
- Coordinates: 32°14′N 78°05′E
- Country: India
- State: Himachal Pradesh
- District: Lahaul and Spiti
- Elevation: 4,440 m (14,570 ft)
- Time zone: UTC+5:30 (IST)
- Postal code: 172114
- Vehicle registration: HP-
- Climate: Dfc

Hikkim is a village in Lahaul and Spiti district in the northern Indian state of Himachal Pradesh at an elevation of 4,400 m (14,400 ft). It is 15 km (9.3 mi) from Kaza, the nearest town connected by road. It is one of the highest year-round inhabited locations in India, with residences from 4330 to 4400 m. Tangyud Monastery in adjacent Komic village 2 km to the southeast has residences up to 4520 m, and Korzok Monastery in adjacent Korzok village on Tso Moriri has year-round residences up to 4570 m. Most of the population is Buddhist. People use stones and wood extensively to build houses and structures.

== Access ==
Hikkim village is situated at a very high elevation (4,400 m (14,400 ft)) in the Himalayas. The village and the region itself remain cut off from other parts of the Himachal Pradesh state for half the year due to heavy snowfall over the mountain passes. An arduous track connects the village to Spiti Valley's Kaza town, 46 km (29 mi) away, the nearest town with access to asphalted road.

== One of the highest post offices in the world ==
Hikkim village has a post office situated at an elevation of 4,400 m (14,400 ft) and this post office is one of the highest post offices in the world. Inarguably, the post office located in India's highest altitude. The post office connects small villages in this isolated region to the rest of the world. It receives and sends postal letters. It also acts as a savings bank where villagers can deposit money in their savings accounts or withdraw money. Intrepid travellers make it this far to Hikkim village to take pride in mailing their letters from the highest post office on Earth. The Postal Index Number or PIN of the village is 172114.

Rinchen Chhering has been the postmaster since its inception in 1983. The mail is carried on foot to Kaza. The post office is forced to shut during winter months due to heavy snowfall.

== Record of highest polling station ==
Hikkim village was the world's highest polling station. It was recorded in the Limca Book of Records. Later the record was held with Tashigang, a small Himachal Pradesh village in the same district.

== Climate ==
According to the Köppen-Geiger system, Hikkim's climate is a subarctic climate (Dfc).

Climate data for Hikkim, Himachal Pradesh
Month	Jan	Feb	Mar	Apr	May	Jun	Jul	Aug	Sep	Oct	Nov	Dec	Year
Mean daily maximum °C (°F)	−5.2 (22.6)	−3.7 (25.3)	0.0 (32.0)	5.3 (41.5)	10.0 (50.0)	14.2 (57.6)	16.0 (60.8)	15.4 (59.7)	12.6 (54.7)	7.1 (44.8)	2.5 (36.5)	−1.7 (28.9)	6.0 (42.9)
Daily mean °C (°F)	−10.6 (12.9)	−9.0 (15.8)	−5.1 (22.8)	0.1 (32.2)	4.3 (39.7)	8.3 (46.9)	10.6 (51.1)	10.2 (50.4)	6.9 (44.4)	1.1 (34.0)	−3.6 (25.5)	−6.6 (20.1)	0.6 (33.0)
Mean daily minimum °C (°F)	−15.9 (3.4)	−14.2 (6.4)	−10.1 (13.8)	−5.1 (22.8)	−1.4 (29.5)	2.4 (36.3)	5.2 (41.4)	5.0 (41.0)	1.2 (34.2)	−4.8 (23.4)	−9.7 (14.5)	−13.4 (7.9)	−5.1 (22.9)
Average precipitation mm (inches)	51.0 (2.01)	48.0 (1.89)	55.0 (2.17)	39.0 (1.54)	37.0 (1.46)	22.0 (0.87)	66.0 (2.60)	72.0 (2.83)	52.0 (2.05)	27.0 (1.06)	12.0 (0.47)	23.0 (0.91)	504 (19.86)

== See also ==
- List of highest towns by country
- List of highest cities in the world
