= Tangyud Monastery =

Tibetan Buddhist monastery near Hikkim, Himachal Pradesh, India

སྟེང་རྒྱུད་དགོན་པ། Tangyud Monastery
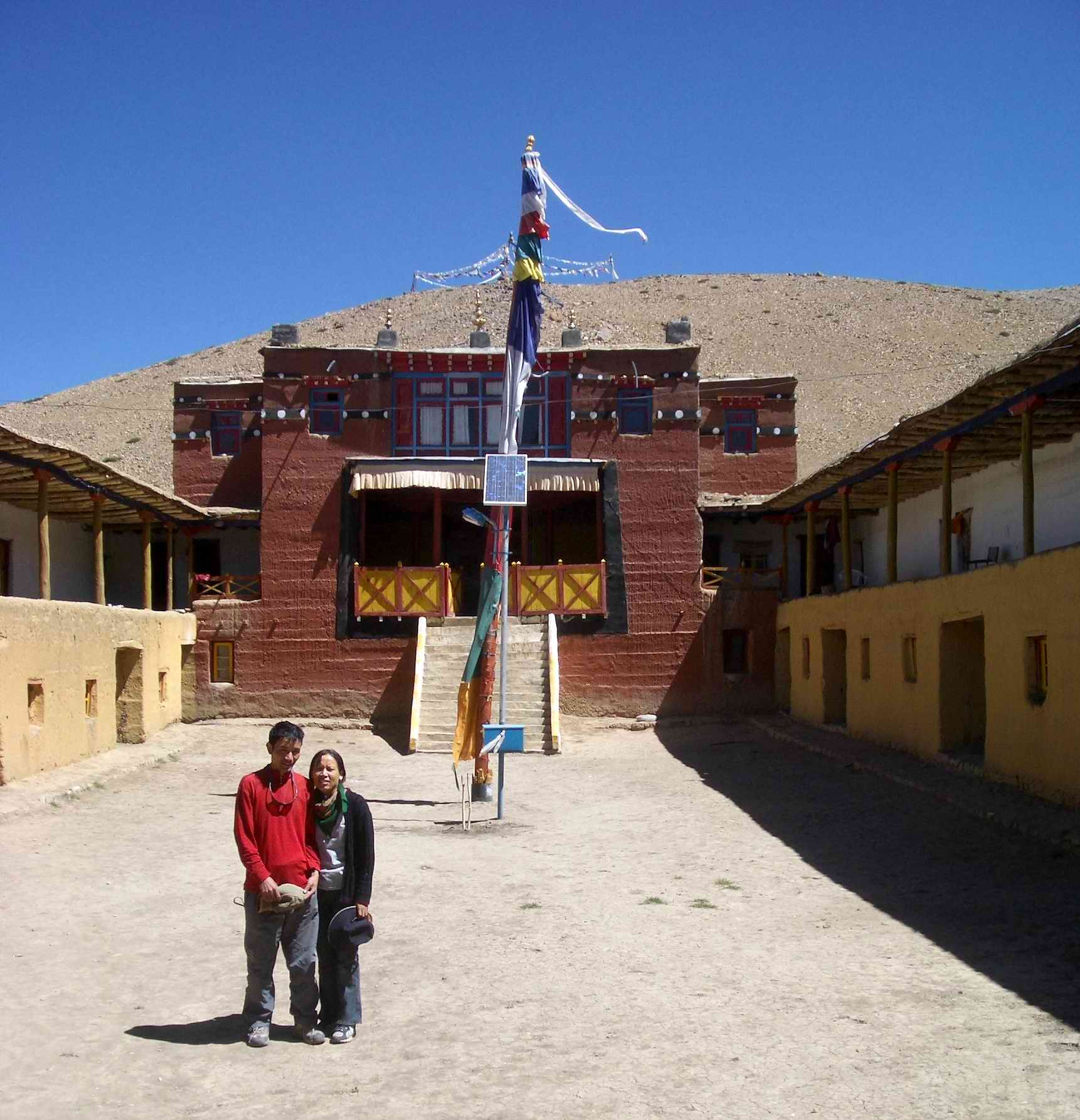
- Entrance to Tangyud Gompa, Spiti, 2004.

- Location within Himachal Pradesh

Religion
- Affiliation: Tibetan Buddhism
- Sect: Sakya Ngor Lineage
- Leadership: Ngor Khangsar Rinpoche

Location
- Location: Lahaul and Spiti, Himachal Pradesh, India
- Interactive map of སྟེང་རྒྱུད་དགོན་པ། Tangyud Monastery
- Coordinates: 32°14′07″N 78°06′40″E

Architecture
- Style: Gompa
- Completed: 11th century

The Tangyud Monastery (also written bTang-rGyud, Tangyuth) or Sa-skya-gong-mig Gompa at the village of Komic, two km southeast of Hikkim in the Spiti Valley of Himachal Pradesh, India, is built like a fortified castle on the edge of a deep canyon, with massive slanted mud walls and battlements with vertical red ochre and white vertical stripes which make them look much taller than they really are. It is one of the highest altitude gompas (monasteries) in India, at an altitude of 4,520 metres (14,830 ft), on the edge of a deep canyon and overlooking the town of Kaza, Spiti 4 km to the west. It is located on the periphery of the Kibber Wildlife Sanctuary.

== History ==
It is one of only two monasteries belonging to the Sakya sect left in Spiti - the other, at Kaza itself, is small and relatively insignificant. It reportedly had 60 monks in 1855.

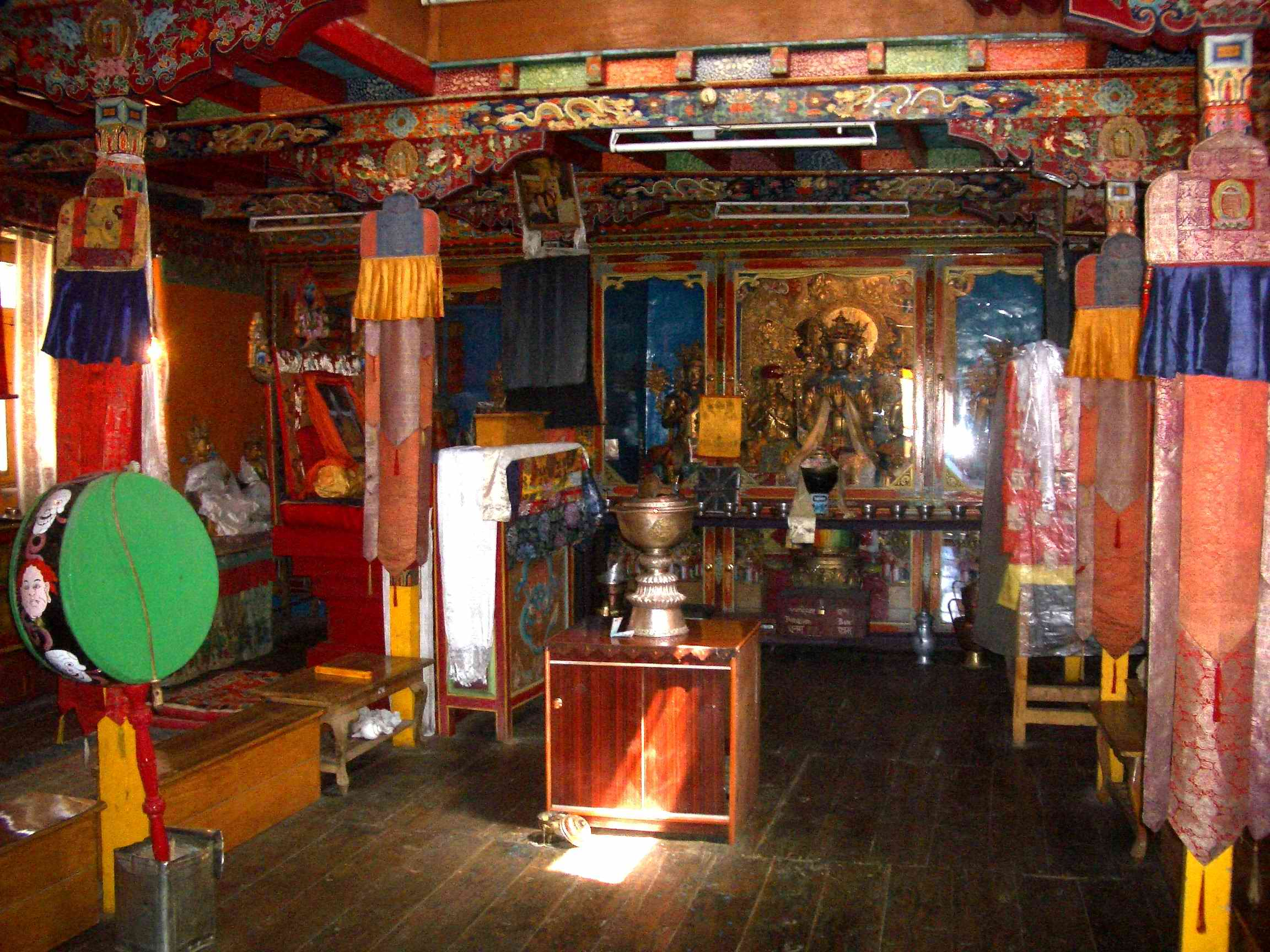
Inside Assembly Hall, Tangyud, Spiti

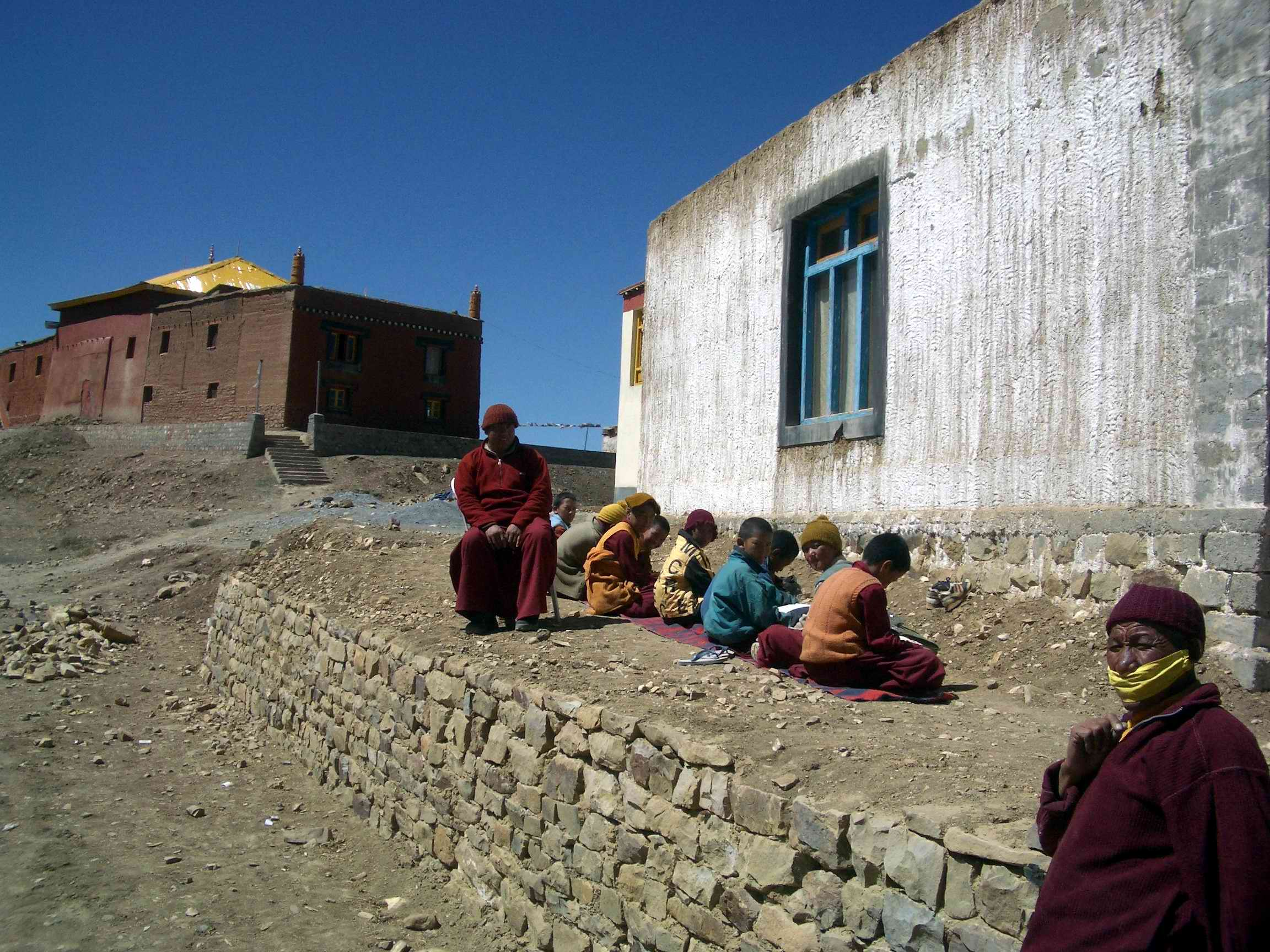
Young monks studying in the sun. Tangyud Gonpa. 2004.

Although it is considered by locals to be very ancient, an examination of the present fortified structure modelled on a Tibetan castle, and other circumstantial evidence, makes it likely that it was built early in the 14th century when the Sakyapas rose to power under Mongol patronage.

It is thought, however, that there was an earlier Kadampa establishment here founded by Rinchen Zangpo (958-1055 CE) and named Rador-lha. The name, Tangyud, may refer to the Sakya revision of the Tang-rGyud, or the 87 volumes of Tantra treatises which form part of the Tengyur. This was carried out about 1310 CE by a team of scholars under the Sakya lama, Ch'os-Kyi-O'd-zer.

The monastery is patronised by the local chieftains of Spiti and the monastery has a special cell built into southeastern side for them when they visit. Tangyud village is at the foot of the monastery (altitude 4,470 m or 14,665 ft). The monastery itself was apparently badly damaged in the earthquake of 1972. And this monastery was several times robbed around 1920-1940 by the thief and robbers from Kashmirs and other parts of the areas. They took all the golds and broke all the statues and monks had to run away from the monastic to save their lives.

== Gallery ==
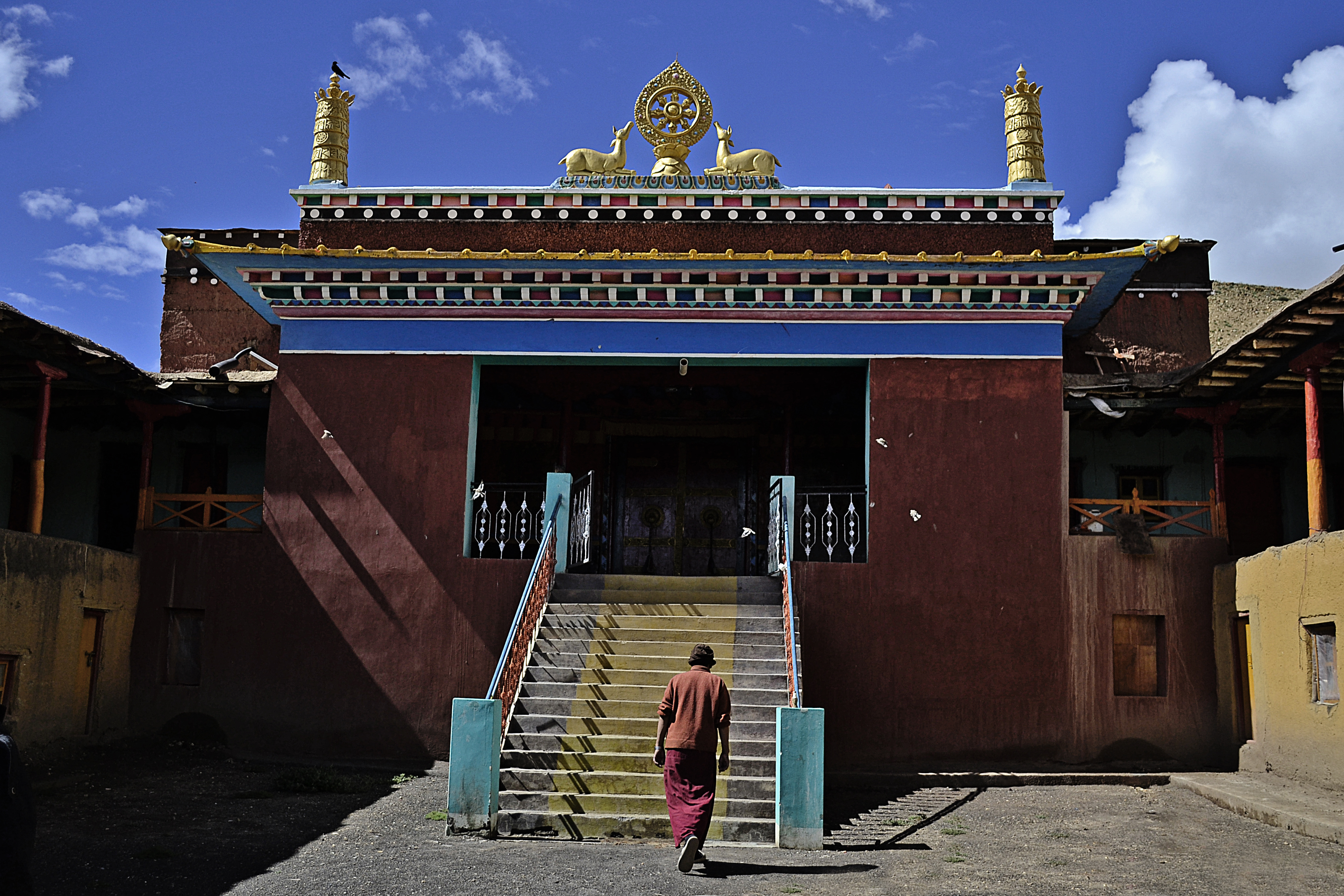
Tangyud Monastery, Komic

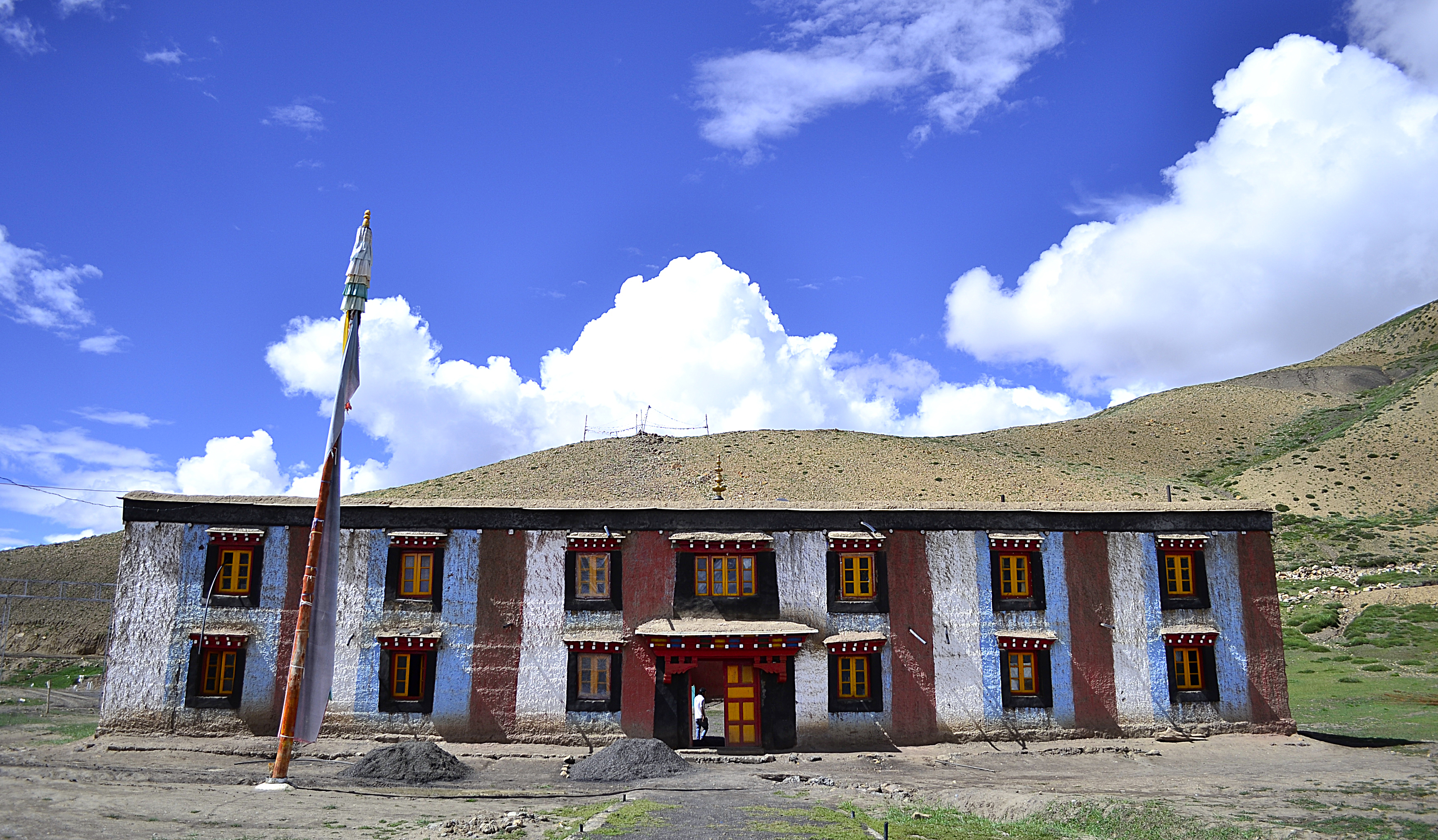
Tangyud Monastery, Komic
