= Dhankhar =

Dhankhar is a Hindu Jat surname. Notable people with this surname include:

- Jagdeep Dhankhar (born 1951), former Vice President of India
- Kanishtha Dhankhar, former Miss India
- Rear Admiral Rajesh Dhankhar, flag officer of the Indian Navy
- Om Prakash Dhankhar, BJP state president, Haryana and former Cabinet Minister Haryana Government
- Sudesh Dhankhar, Indian doctor, Second Lady of India
