= Tabo, Himachal Pradesh =

Town and village in Himachal Pradesh, India

Tabo taboco
- town
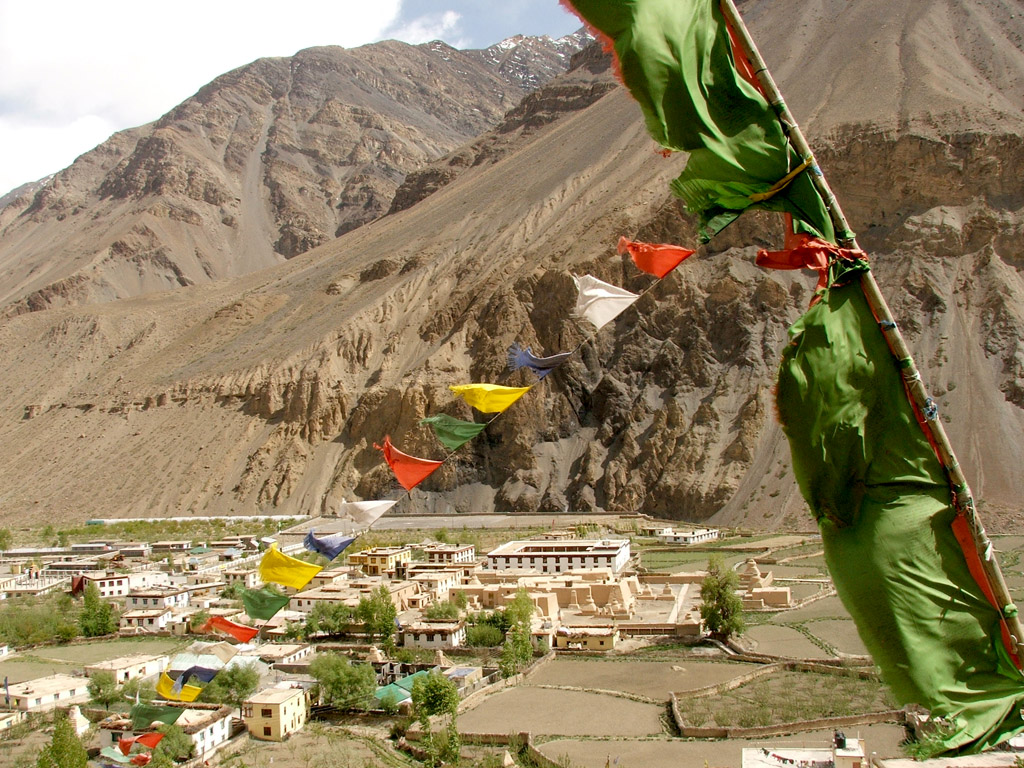
- Tabo Gompa, Spiti
- Nickname: tabaco
- Location in Himachal Pradesh, India Tabo (India)
- Coordinates: 32.0937°N 78.3829°E
- Country: India
- State: Himachal Pradesh
- District: Lahaul and Spiti

Government
  - Type: Municipal corporation
  - Body: Nagar Palika
- Elevation: 3,280 m (10,760 ft)

Languages
  - Official: Hindi
- Time zone: UTC+5:30 (IST)
- Vehicle registration: HP-

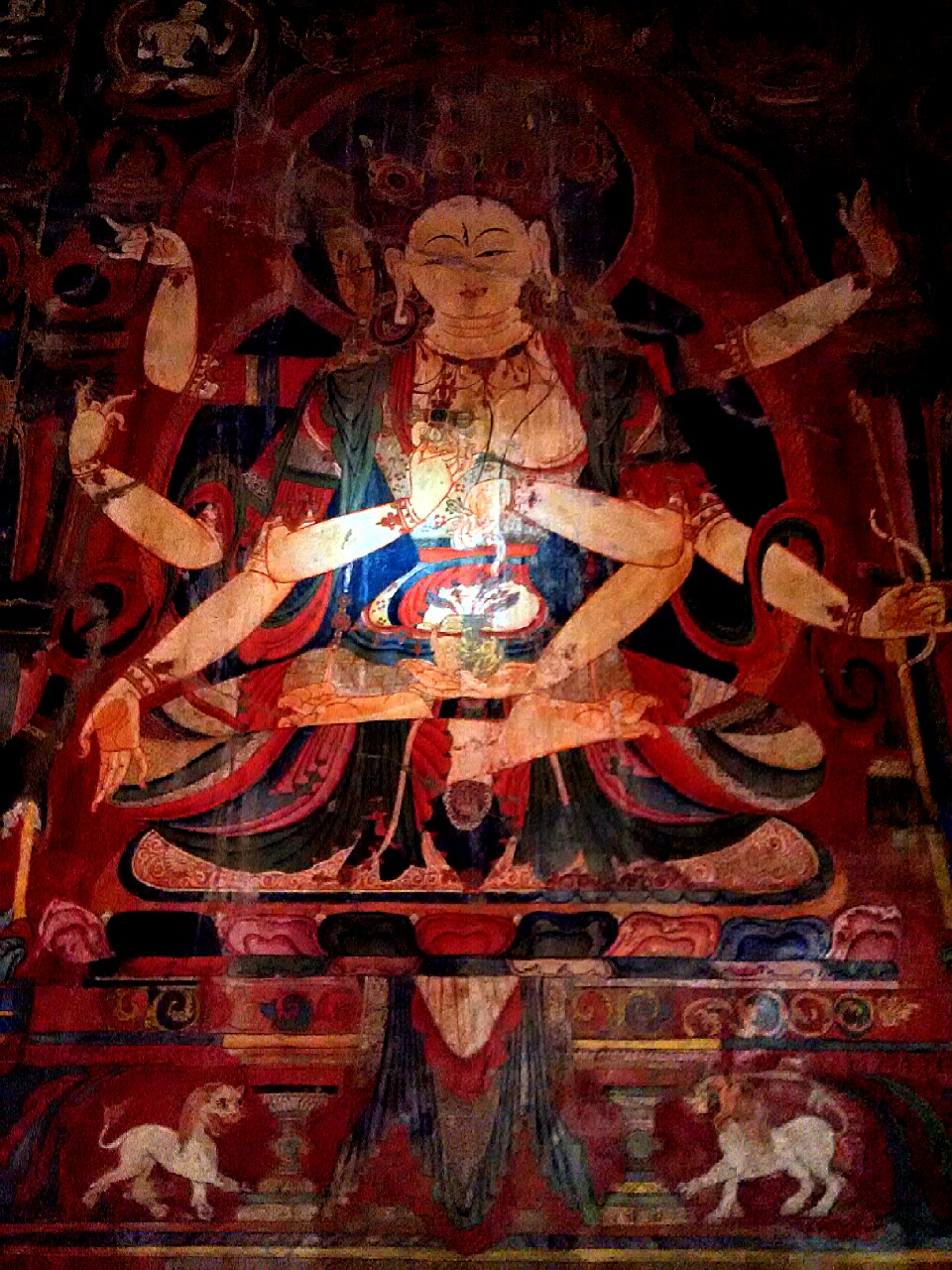
Painting inside Tabo Monastery

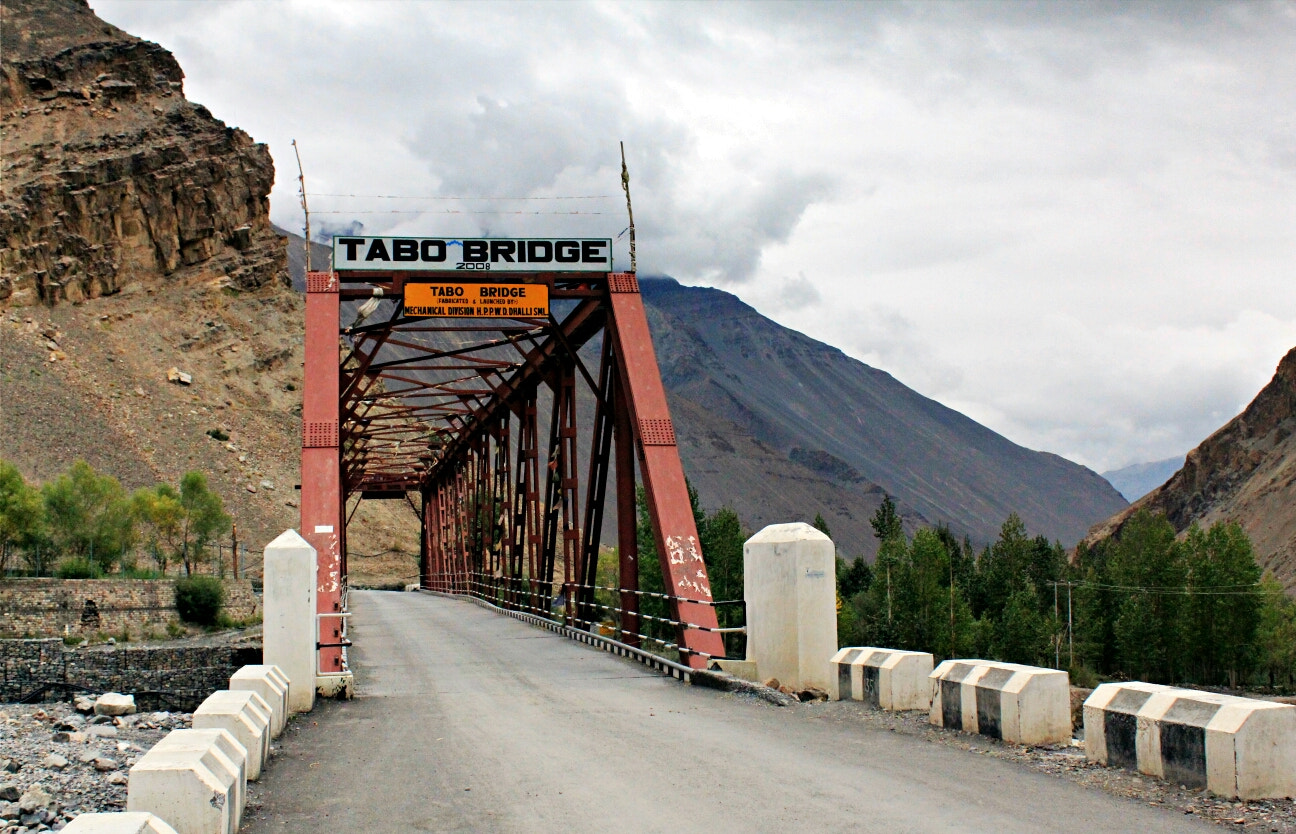
Tabo Bridge. Tabo, Spiti, HP

Tabo is a small town in the Lahaul and Spiti district on the banks of the Spiti River in Himachal Pradesh, India. The town lies on the road between Rekong Peo and Kaza (alternative spelling: Kaja), the sub-divisional headquarters of Spiti. The town surrounds a Buddhist monastery which, according to legend, is said to be over a thousand years old. The Dalai Lama has expressed his desire to retire to Tabo, since he maintains that the Tabo Monastery is one of the holiest. In 1996, the Dalai Lama conducted the Kalachakra initiation ceremony in Tabo, which coincided with the millennium anniversary celebrations of the Tabo monastery. The ceremony was attended by thousands of Buddhists from across the world. Tabo Monastery's spiritual head is Tsenshap Serkong Rinpoche.

== Geography and climate ==
The village is situated at an altitude of 10,760 ft (3,280 metres). Climate in Tabo is very unpredictable as it ranges from cloudy to sunny and from snow to heavy snowfall. Summers are short from May to August and winters are longer from mid-September to April. Winter temperatures in Tabo can range from 5 °C (41 °F) in the day to −25 °C (−13 °F) overnight. In summers, temperature ranges from −5 °C (23 °F) at night to 30 °C (86 °F) Celsius in daytime.

== Places of interest ==
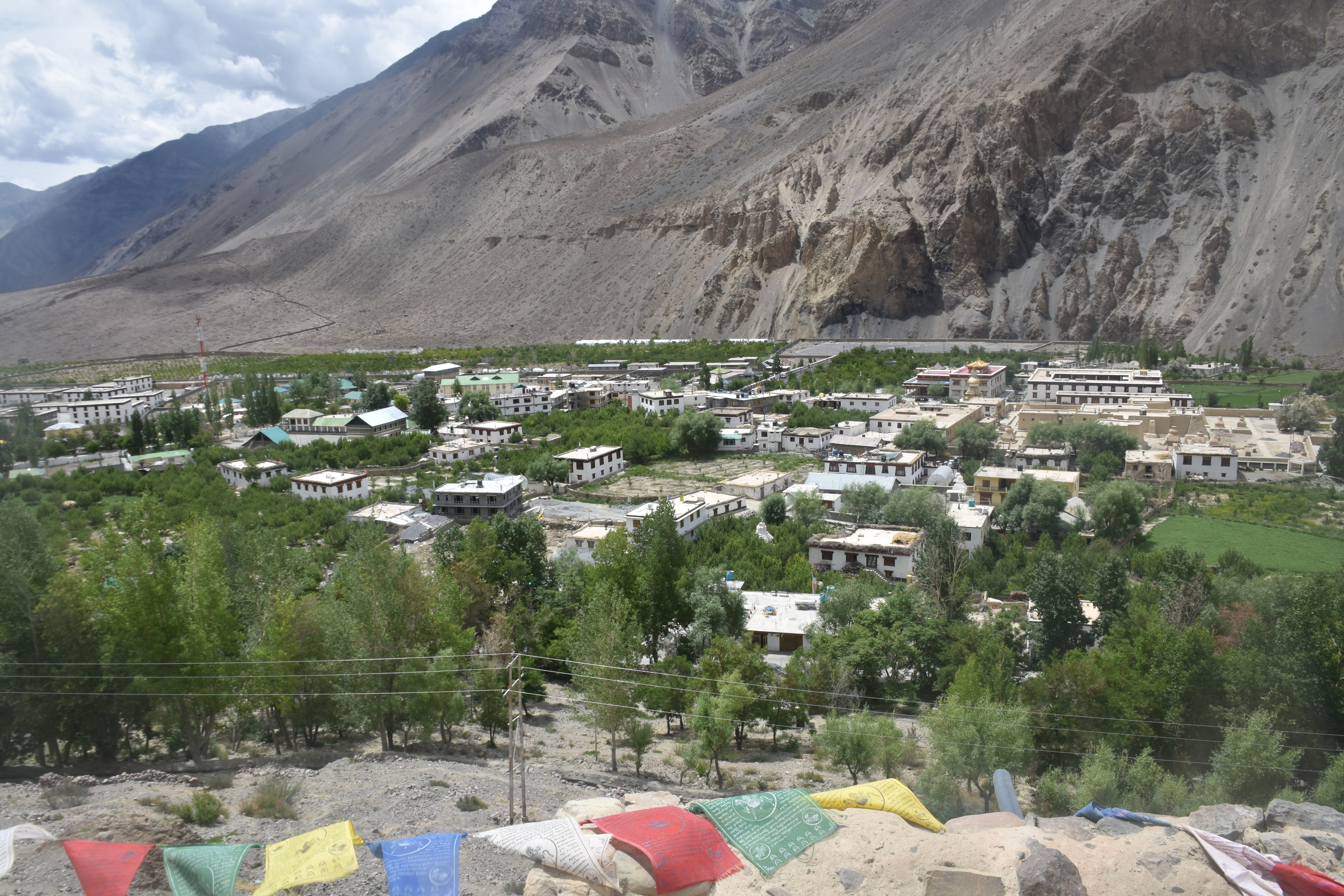
Tabo village as seen from Tabo Caves

The temples within the monastery complex in Tabo have a plethora of wall paintings and mud statues. The Archaeological Survey of India (ASI) attempted to restore some paintings that were ravaged by time, but were not very successful. Photography, however, is not permitted inside the monastery. Near the monastery there is a souvenir shop.

== Tourism ==
There are a few hotels in Tabo, of which the Banjara Camps retreat is the most luxurious. The temperatures here plummet at night. There are other hotels and hostels like Dekit Norphel Tiger Den Restaurant, Tashi Gangsar, Menthok Dumra at Tabo, including the monastery's own guest houses.

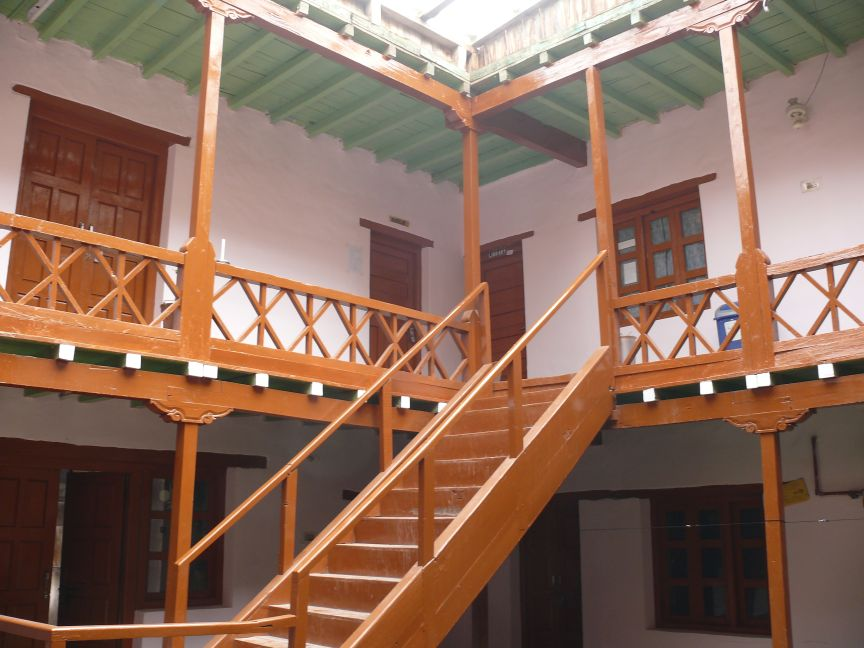
Tabo Monastery Guest House

== Transport ==
Tabo lies right on the NH 505. Tabo also has a helipad.

Mobile phone networks do not work well in Tabo in Spiti Valley, except BSNL & Jio network. Tabo is connected to other major towns like Kaza and Kalpa with Himachal Pradesh Road Transport Network.
