= Kaza, Himachal Pradesh =

Kaza, Himachal Pradesh Kaza Karze or Karzey
- town
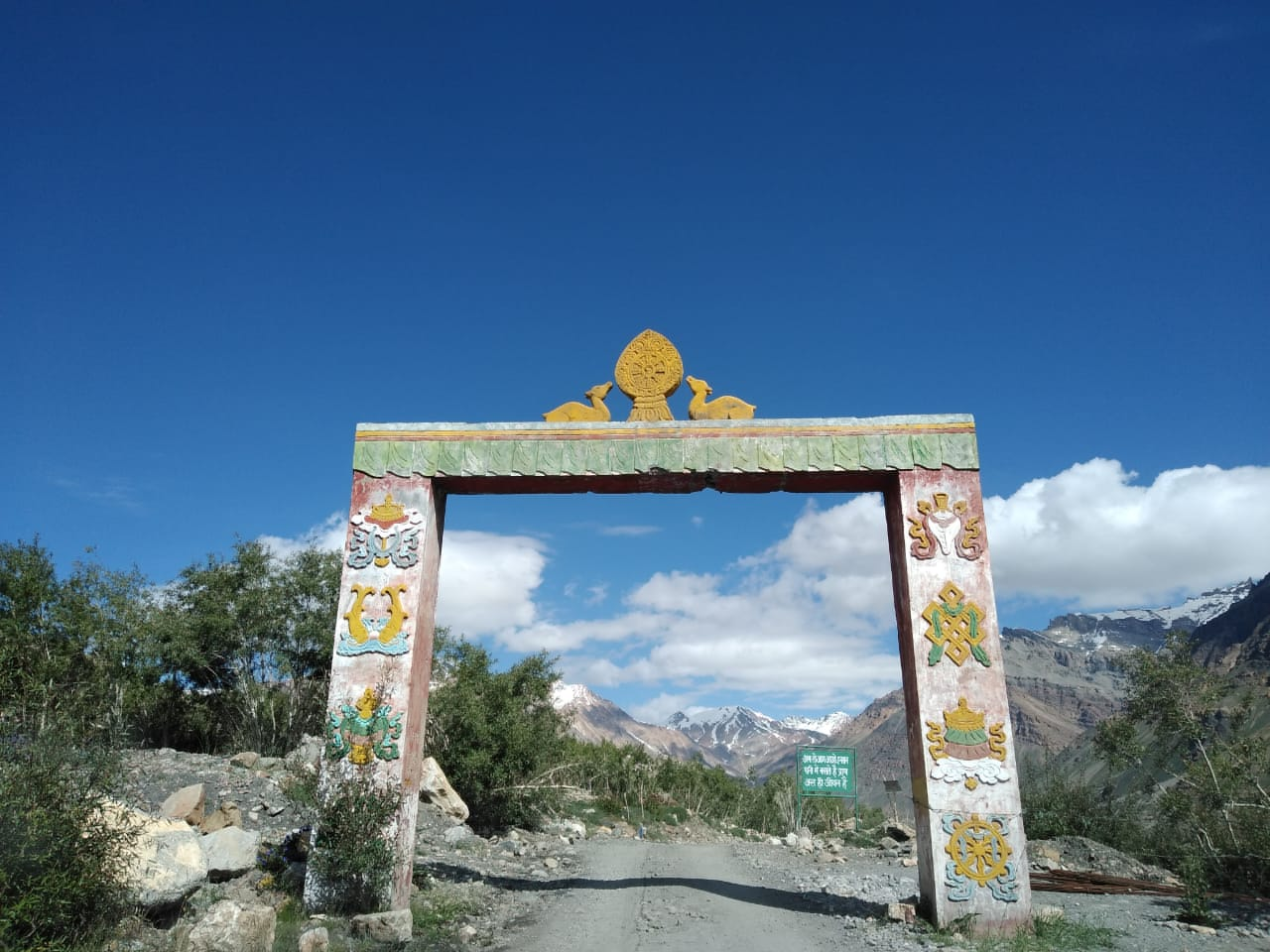
- Kaza Losar Entry Gate

- Location in Himachal Pradesh, India
- Coordinates: 32°13′32″N 78°04′17″E
- Country: India
- State: Himachal Pradesh
- District: Lahaul and Spiti
- Elevation: 3,650 m (11,980 ft)

Population
  - Total: 3,231

Languages
  - Official: Hindi
  - Native: Lahuli–Spiti languages
- Time zone: UTC+5:00 (PST)
- PIN: 172114
- Telephone code: 01906 - STD code
- Vehicle registration: H.P.- 41
- Sex ratio: 974 ♂/♀

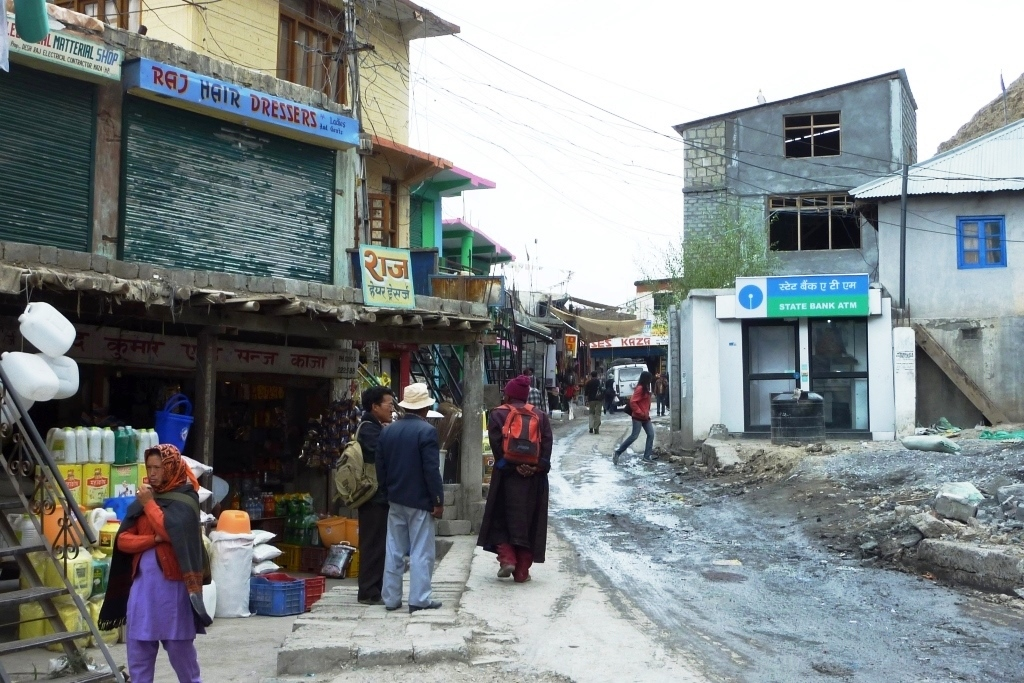
Downtown Kaza

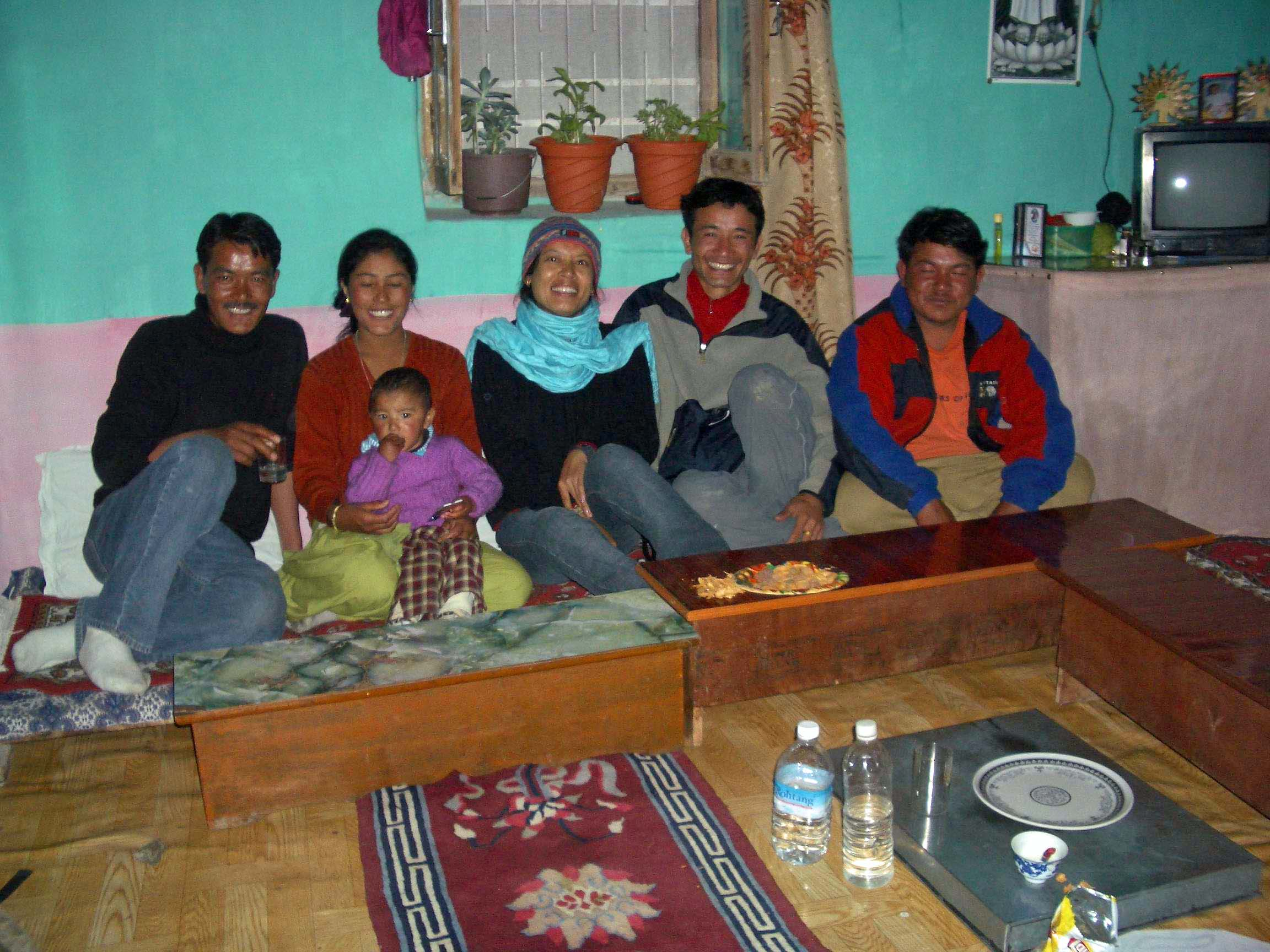
Family at home with visitors, Kaza, 2004

Kaza, also spelled Kaze, Karze, Karzey, is a town and the subdivisional headquarters of the remote Spiti Valley in the western Himalayas in the Lahaul and Spiti district of the northern Indian state of Himachal Pradesh. Spiti is a high altitude or cold desert having close similarities to the neighbouring Tibet and Ladakh regions in terms of terrain, climate and the Buddhist culture. Kaza, situated along the Spiti River at an elevation of 3,650 m (11,980 ft) above mean sea level, is the largest township and commercial centre of the Spiti valley.

== History ==
The Tangyud (Tang-rGyud) Gompa of village Komik dates to the early 14th century and is built like a fortified castle, with massive slanted mud walls and battlements, with vertical red ochre and white vertical stripes. It is on the edge of a deep canyon and overlooks the town of Kaza, 4 km from the town. Kaza hosts a branch of the Tangyud Gompa.

The town is divided into the old, as Kaza Khas, and new as Kaza Soma sections. The new town contains the administrative buildings. Approaching Kaza from the south, one sees Kyu-ling (Skyid-gling), the stately palace of the Nono (king), on the other side of the river.

== Geography ==
Kaza is overlooked by high mountain ridges on the NE and SW sides. The Spiti River runs from NW to SE past Kaza. Kaza is one of the coldest towns in India. The temperature varies greatly in different seasons as well as within a day. January is the coldest month of the year with a minimum temperature of −30 °C or −22 °F, while July is the hottest month with an average temperature of 15 °C or 59 °F, although summer nights may still fall to freezing.

== Tourism ==
=== Adventure and trekking ===
Kaza is known for its colourful festivals and the ruins of the ancient Sakya Tangyud Monastery, located near village Komik, 14 kilometres or 8.7 miles from Kaza. It is also popular with tourists and adventure seekers during the period of June, July and August and September because of its central location and connections to the rest of the valley (Connects to Leh-Manali Highway via Kunzum Pass). This central location also makes Kaza an ideal base camp for trekking, mountaineering, and tours directed to other parts of the valley. The highest post office in the world at Hikkim village (PIN 172114) at an elevation of 4,400 m (14,400 ft) is situated 46 km (29 mi) from Kaza. It sends postal letters to and receives postal articles from Kaza post office.

=== Festivals ===
The prominent festivals celebrated in Kaza are Ladarcha (mid-August), Spiti Losar (around November), and Dachang (around February). The Ladarcha fair is the largest annual event in all of Spiti. In earlier times, it used to be a multi-day trade fair held annually in July at the Ladarcha ground near Chichim village in upper Spiti. It used to witness barter trade among locals of Spiti and traders from Ladakh, Bushahr princely state, Tibet, and Kullu. The old trade fair ended following the Sino-Indian war of 1962. The fair was revived by the Himachal Pradesh government in the 1980s. The location of the revived fair, now primarily a cultural event, was shifted from the Ladarcha ground near Chichim to Kaza. In recent decades, the Ladarcha fair has been held every year in August, typically in its third week, right after Independence Day.

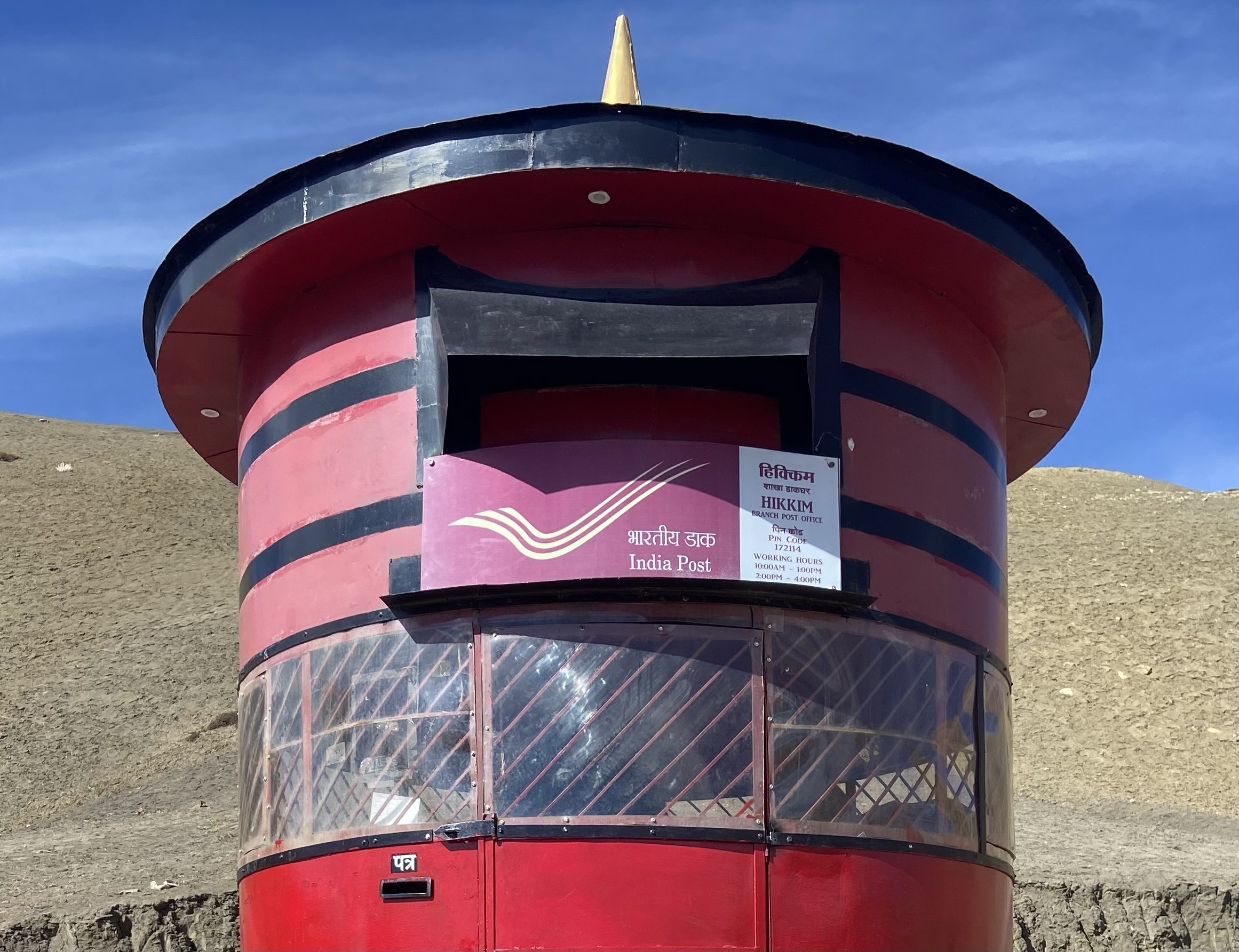
Hikkim- The World’s Highest Post Office

=== Monasteries ===
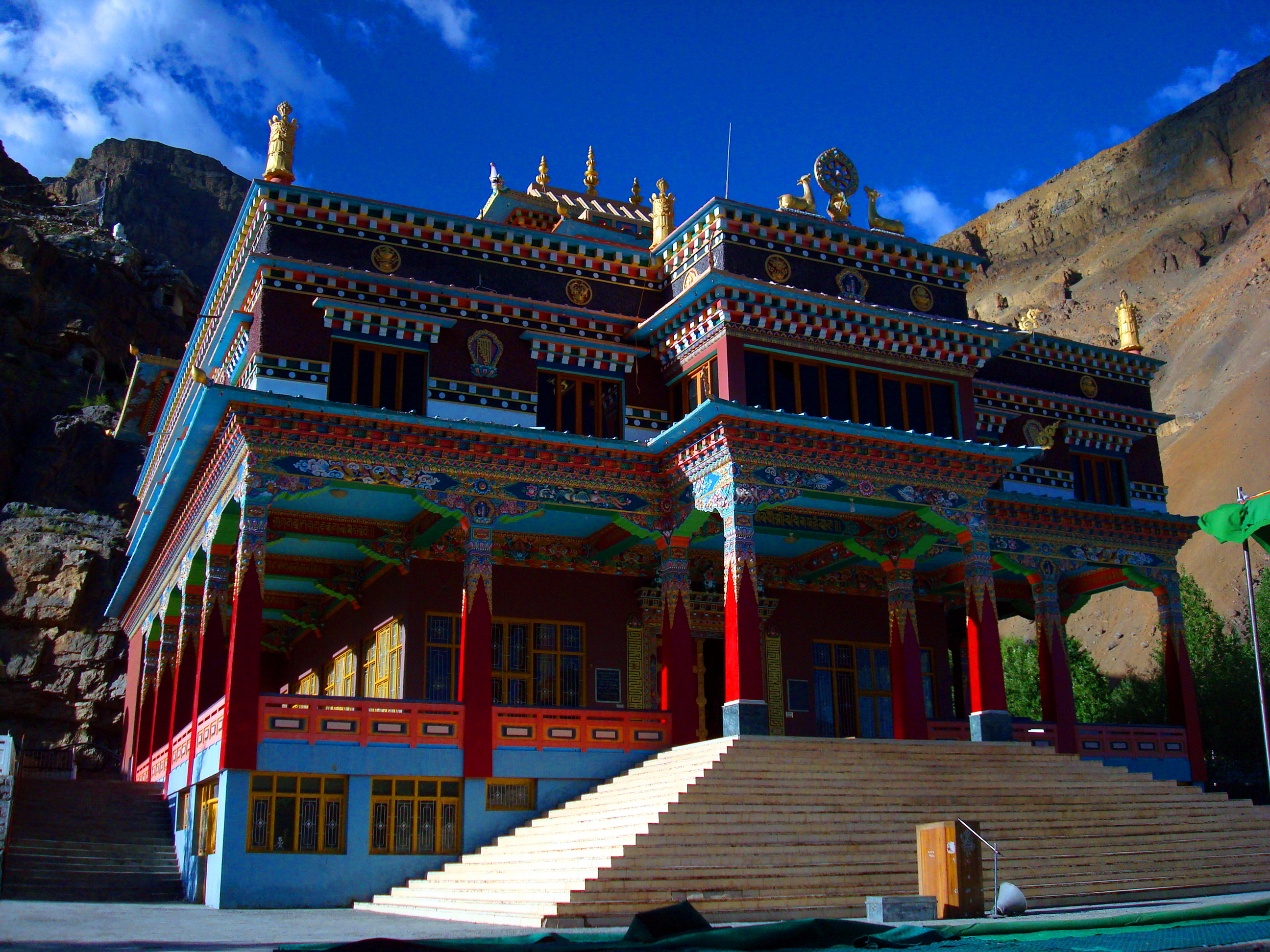
Sakya Monastery at Kaza.

Sakya Tangyud monastery; built in the year 2009, Sakya Tangyud monastery is situated in Kaza town of Spiti Valley. Key (Ki) Monastery was built by Dromton, a student of the renowned instructor, Atisha, in the eleventh century and is located at a height of 4,166 m (13,668 ft) about 12 km (7.5 mi) north of Kaza town.

=== Facilities ===
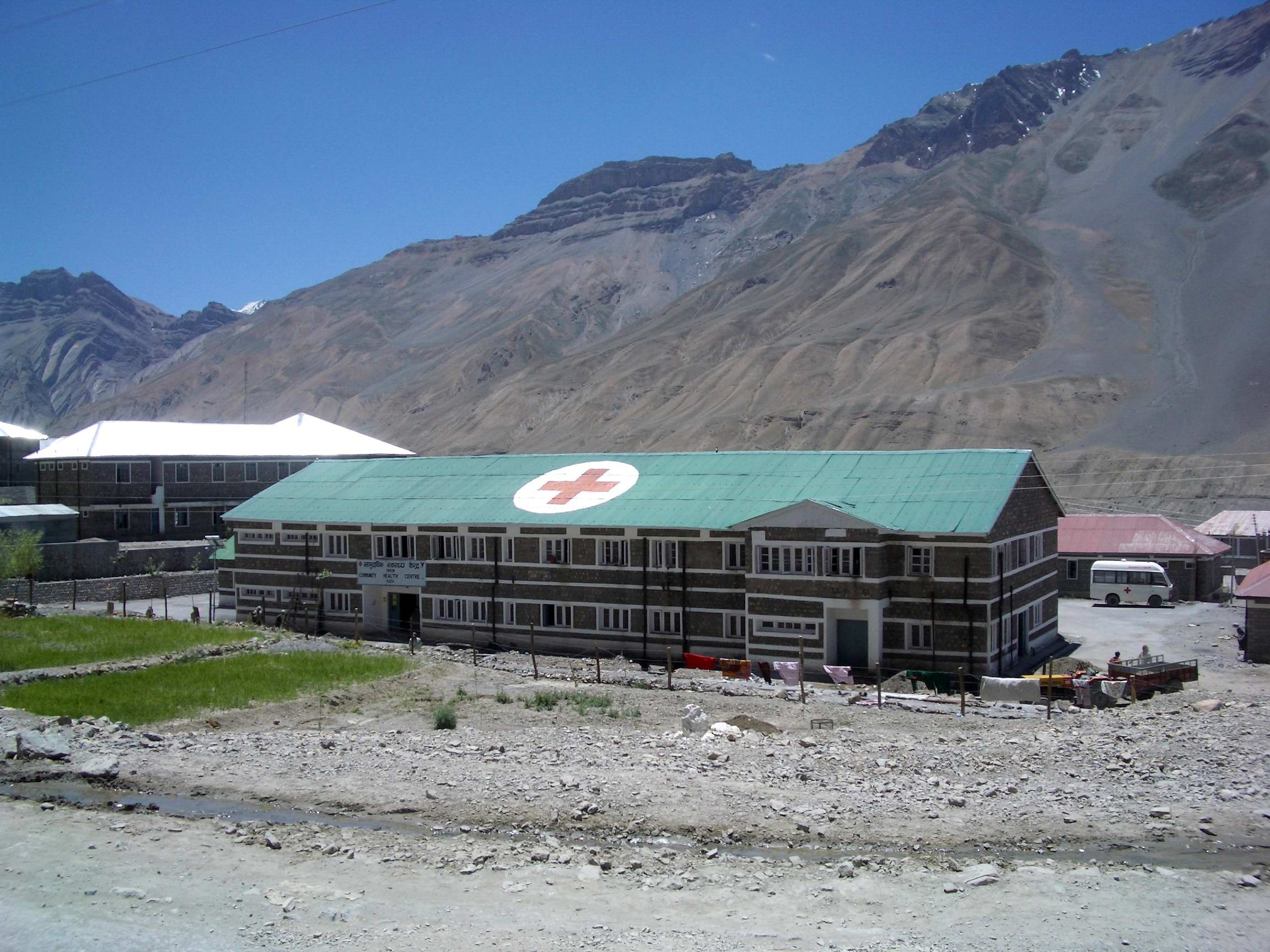
Community Health Centre at Kaza, c. 2004.

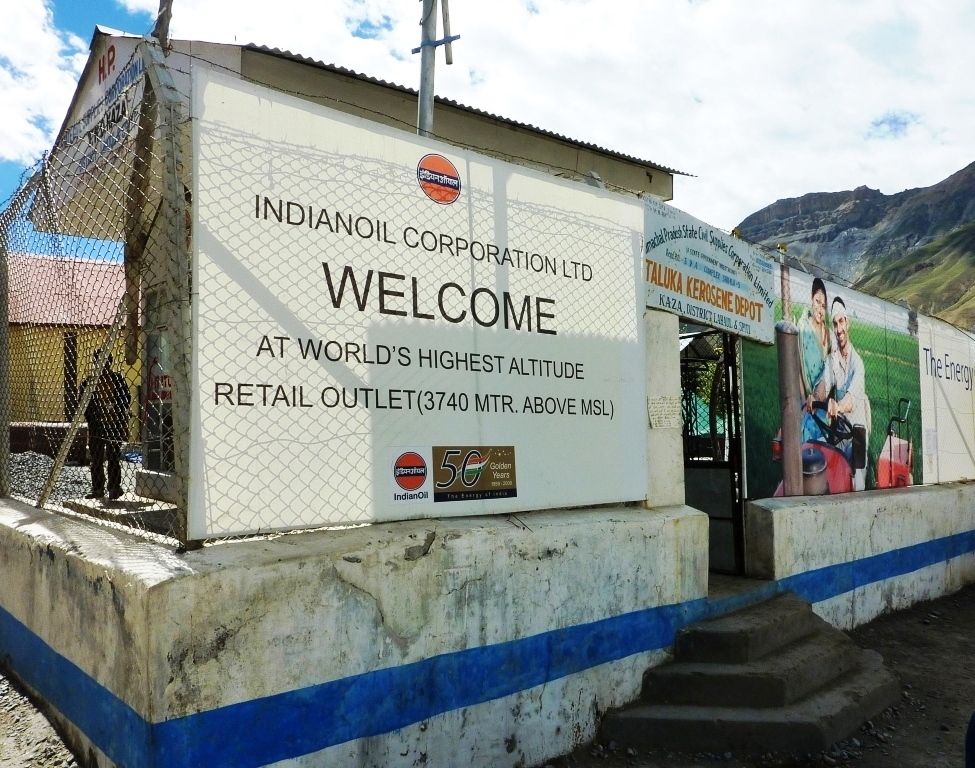
Petrol bunk at Kaza.

- Government services: Kaza has a Community Health Centre, Police Station, a petrol bunk (only one in Spiti Valley), and a Government Gym (said to be the world's highest, open to both locals and tourists).
- Mobile internet services: Provided by BSNL, Airtel 4G and Jio 4G.

== Transport ==
=== Rangrik airbase ===
The Indian Military is constructing an airbase at Rangrik (7 km northwest of Kaza & 100 km west of Kaurik on LAC) in Spiti valley which will also cater for the civilian flights. It was announced in January 2023, and it will be completed by the end of 2024.

=== Roads ===
Kaza has several access routes. Kaza has a petrol bunk which is the only one in Spiti Valley as of 2022.

- NH505 Shimla-Tabo-Kaza Road (existing): It connects Kaza to Manali in the southwest, and Kaurik, Sumdo, Pooh & Tabo in the east. Kaza-Pooh-Tabo-Shimla route is open the whole year, but the Manali-Kaza route is closed for 7 winter months every year during which Kunzum Pass (15,000 ft) is closed. NHAI is planning to construct a tunnel under the Kunzum Pass to provide all-weather connectivity between Manali and Spiti valley. The route via NH 505 through Kinnaur is open throughout the year, except for occasional short periods resulting from landslides or heavy snowfall. This road, starting from Shimla, follows the Sutlej river unto a little beyond Poo, thereafter turning northwards to follow the Spiti river all the way to Kaza.

  - Kinnaur-Kaza Road (Bhavnagar-Mud-Kaza Road) (under-construction since 2022): 64 km road will reduce Shimla-Kaza travel time by 4 hours and route length by 150 km (from existing 468km to 318km) and travel time by four hours. In 2022 after government paid Rs21 cr to forests dept for the forest land acquisition. As of May 2026, road construction was yet to begin even though the DPR for the road costing Rs99 cr was ready but the project was still awaiting forests department approval as it runs through the Pin Valley National Park.

- Manali-Kaza Road (existing): The other road starts from Manali and after crossing the 13,090 ft (3,990 m) high Rohtang Pass to reach Gramphoo where it joins the road from Keylong and proceeds south along Chandra River till Batal then climbs up to cross the 14,928 ft (4,550 m) high Kunzum Pass, enters the Spiti valley to reach Kaza. It remains closed during winter months, normally from October to June due to heavy snowfall on both those passes.

  - Hanle-Kaza-Tabo Road (under-construction since 2022): Being constructed by the BRO under Indo-China Border Roads (ICBR) scheme, this road will join the Manali-Kaza Road near Kibbar. Hanle-Chumar section was completed and made operational for the tourists since 2025. Chumar-Kaza section is still under construction as of 2026.

== See also ==
- Indo-China Border Roads
- India–China border infrastructure

== Bibliography ==
- Ciliberto, Jonathan. (2013). "Six Weeks in the Spiti Valley". Circle B Press. 2013. Atlanta. ISBN 978-0-9659336-6-7
- Francke, A. H. (1914, 1926). Antiquities of Indian Tibet. Two Volumes. Calcutta. 1972 reprint: S. Chand, New Delhi.
- Handa, O. C. (1987). Buddhist Monasteries in Himachal Pradesh. Indus Publishing Company, New Delhi. ISBN 978-81-85182-03-2.
- Kapadia, Harish. (1999). Spiti: Adventures in the Trans-Himalaya. Second Edition. (1st edition 1996). Indus Publishing Company, New Delhi. ISBN 81-7387-093-4.
