= Bhaba Pass =

Mountain pass in India

- Bhawa Pass; Pin Bhaba Pass
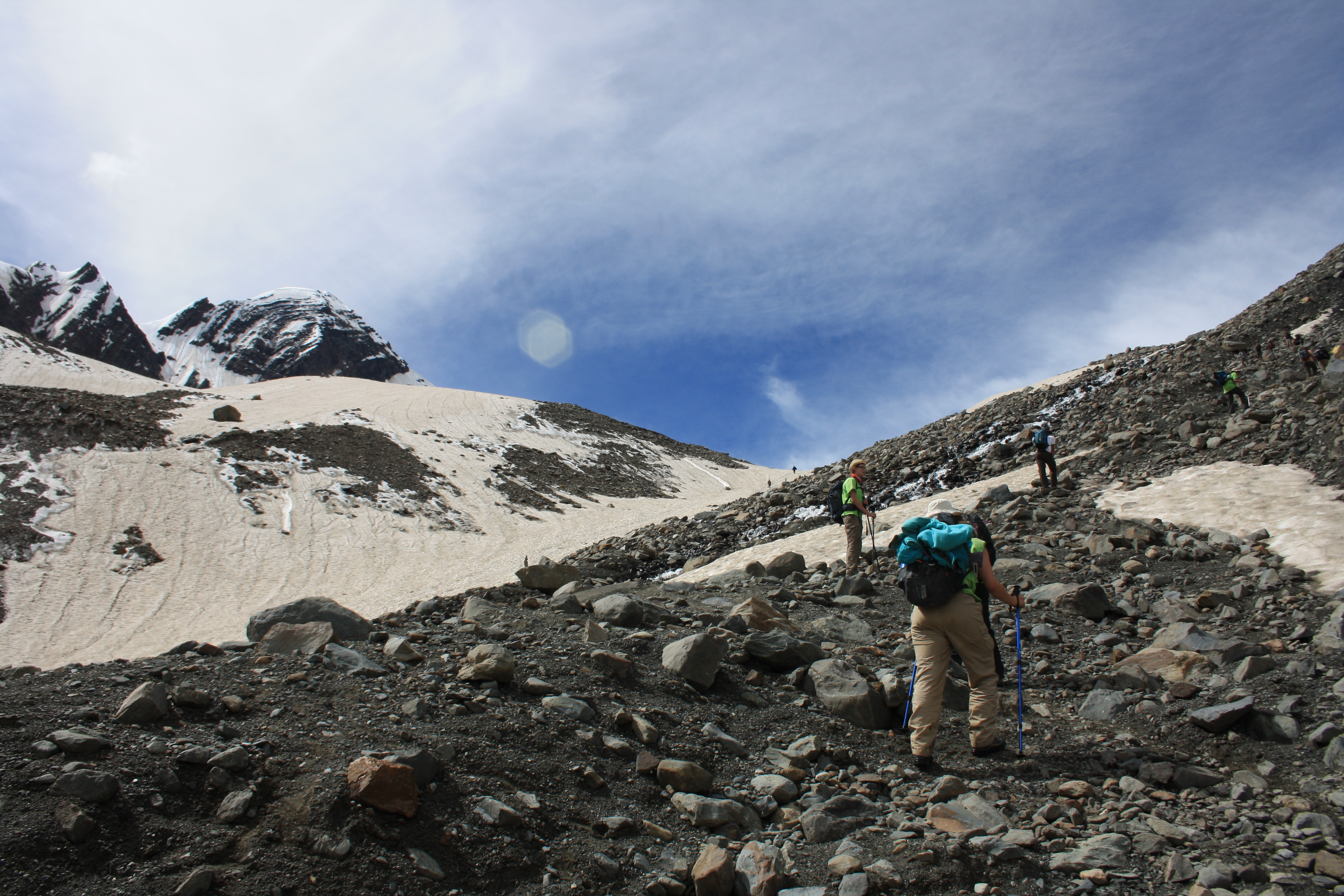
- View of the northern side of the pass

- Location within Himachal Pradesh
- Elevation: 4,890 metres (16,040 ft)

Third Approach
- Location: Himachal Pradesh, India
- Range: Himalayas
- Coordinates: 31°47′13″N 77°59′46″E

Bhaba Pass, also known as Bhawa Pass, is a high mountain pass (elevation 4,890 metres (16,040 ft)) situated in the northern Indian state of Himachal Pradesh in the Indian Himalayas. It is located on the border of Kinnaur district and Lahaul and Spiti District, and borders Pin Valley National Park and the Rupi-Bhaba Wildlife Sanctuary.

Bhaba Pass connects the green and fertile Bhaba valley on the Kinnaur side with the barren high-elevation Pin valley on the Spiti side.

== Overview ==
National Highway 22 runs alongside River Sutlej until Wangtu gives way to a narrow road leading to Katgaon and Kafnu. Katgaon and Kafnu are the base for one of the most beautiful trek routes in Himachal, the Bhaba trek. A moderate climb towards a glacial fed stream Bhaba river, to Bhabha Pass at 4,890 metres (16,040 ft) elevation to enter Pin Valley in Spiti is a challenging adventure. The first village in Spiti is Mud. Another trek in the west from the Bhaba Pass gets into Parvati Valley of Kullu.

== Distance ==
- Delhi: 545 km (339 mi)
- Shimla: 203 km (126 mi)
- Chandigarh: 315 km (196 mi)

== Transport ==
In early 2022, the Government of Himachal Pradesh approved construction of a new road connecting the Satluj Valley, Kinnaur District to the Spiti Valley via Mud. The new 72 km (45 mi) road will run from Kafnu (NH-5) in Kinnaur to Mud, connecting to NH-505 near Atargu Bridge on the Spiti river. The new bypass will reduce the 460 km (290 mi) distance from Shimla to Kaza by 105 km (65 mi). This will open up the Pin Valley National Park, Mud and the Spiti Valley to tourism. Bhabha Pass Tunnel is planned to connect Bhaba Valley to Mud in Pin Valley. See also tunnels in North West India.

== Gallery ==
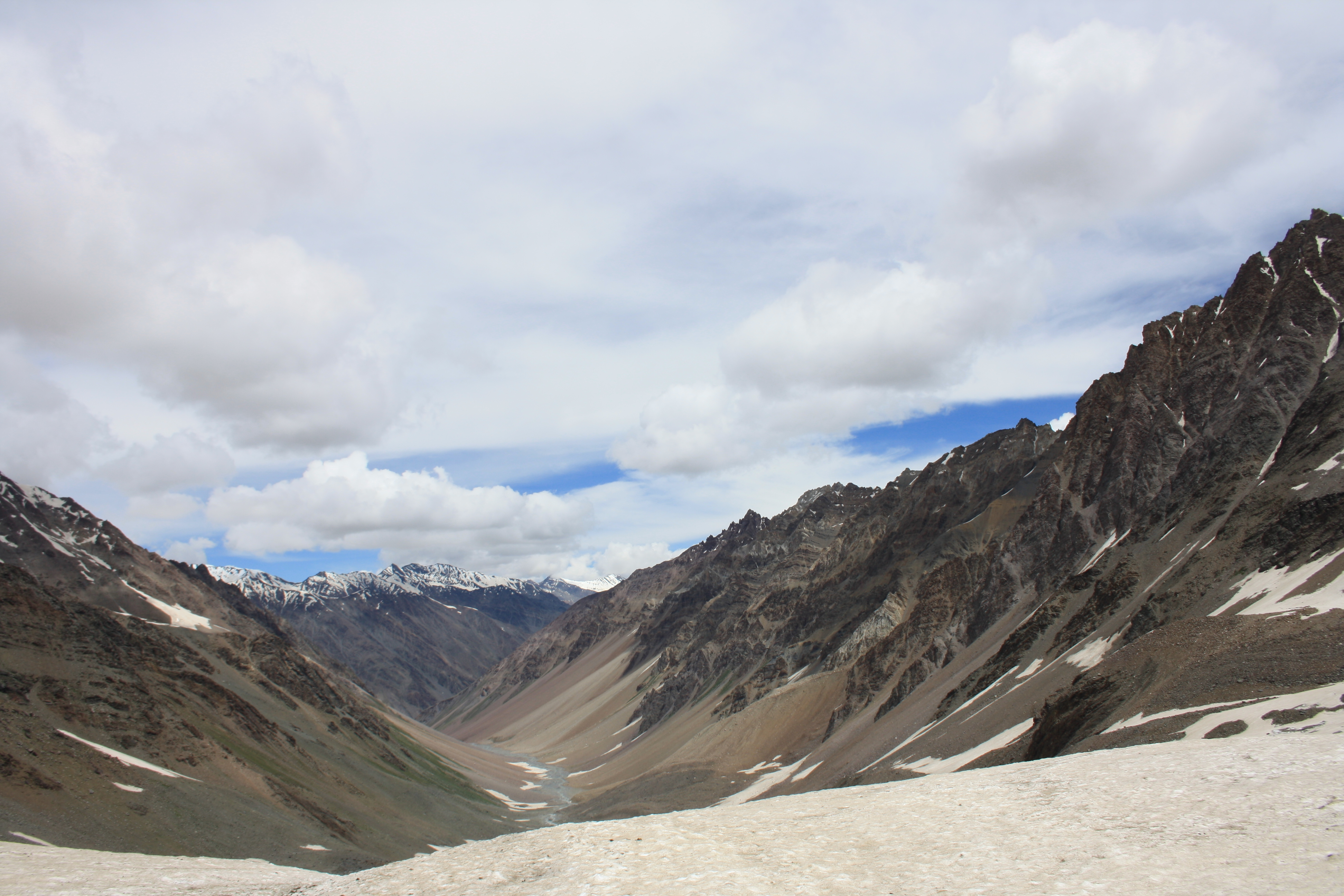
The view north from the pass towards the Pin River

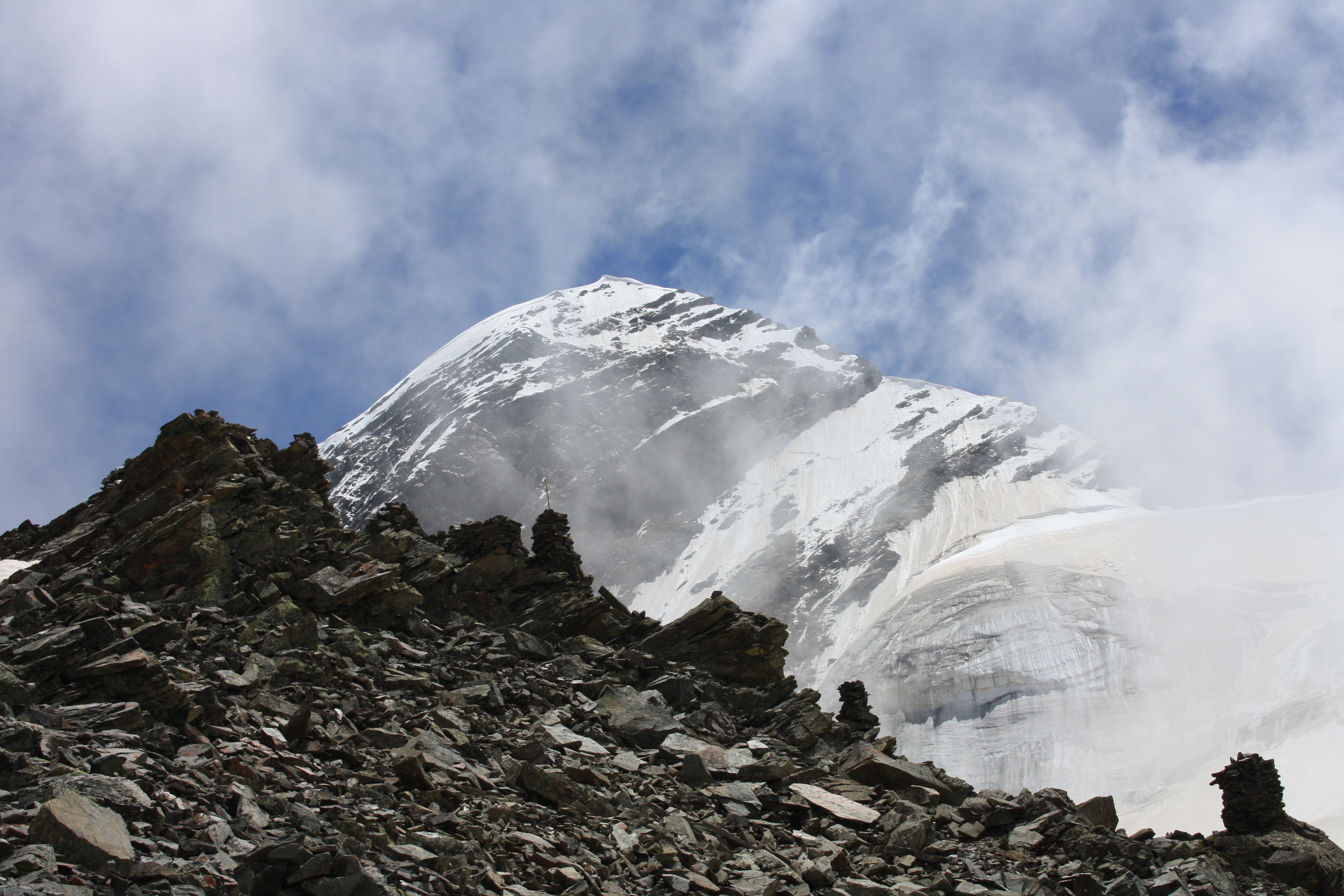
The top of the pass, and a mountain overlooking the pass.

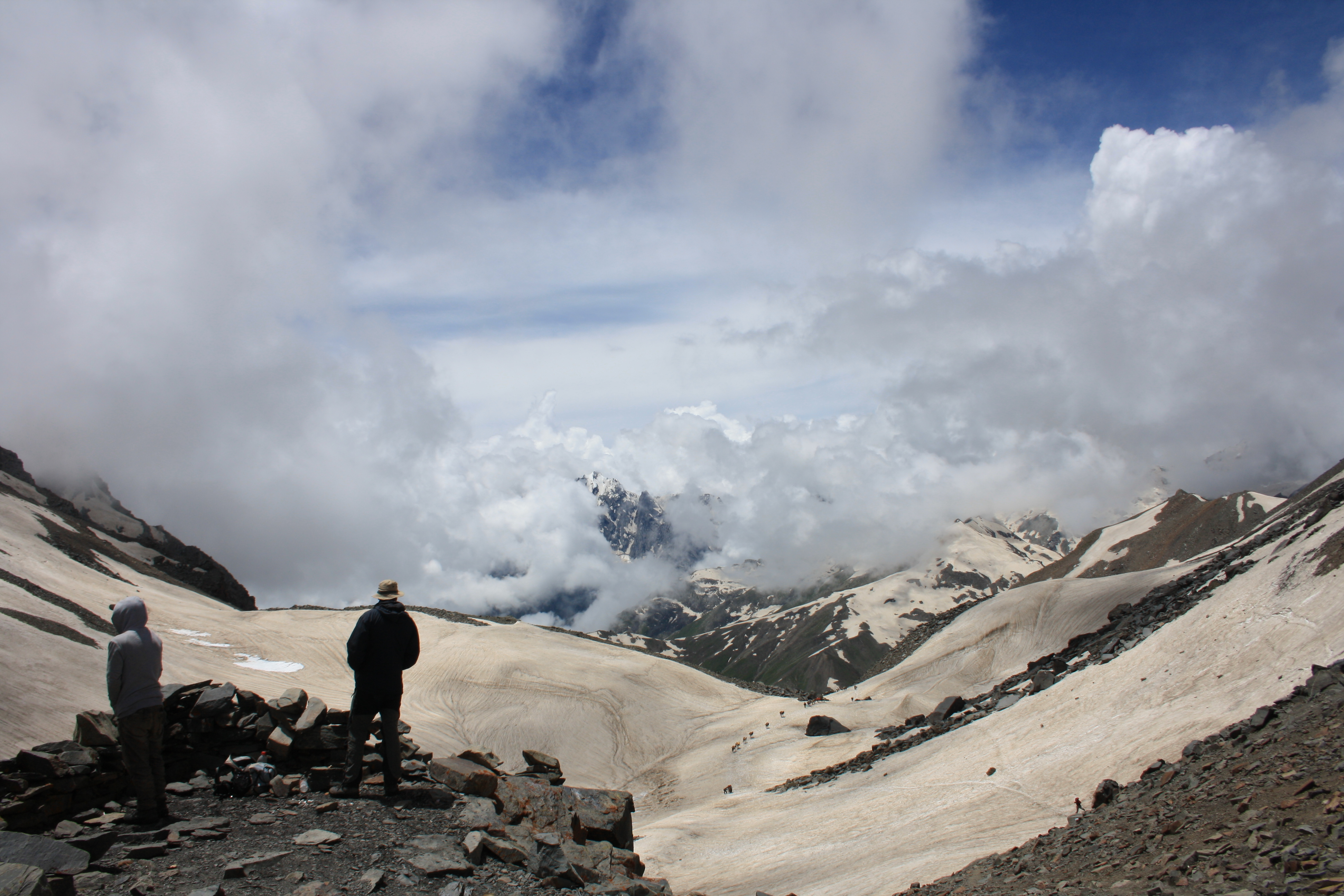
The view south from the pass towards Bhaba valley

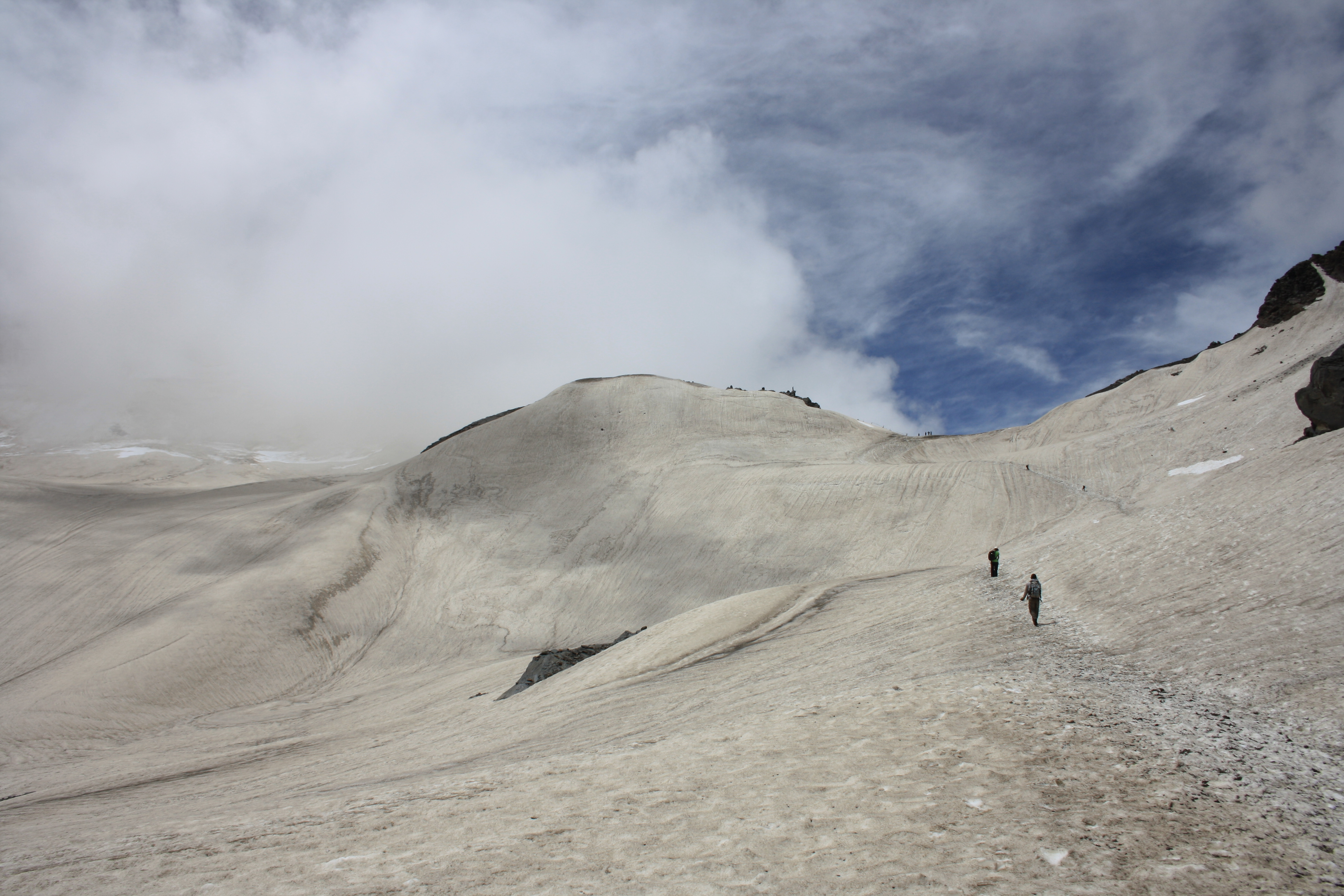
Icy terrain on the southern side of the pass.
