= Mud (village) =

Mud Mudh, Muth
- Village
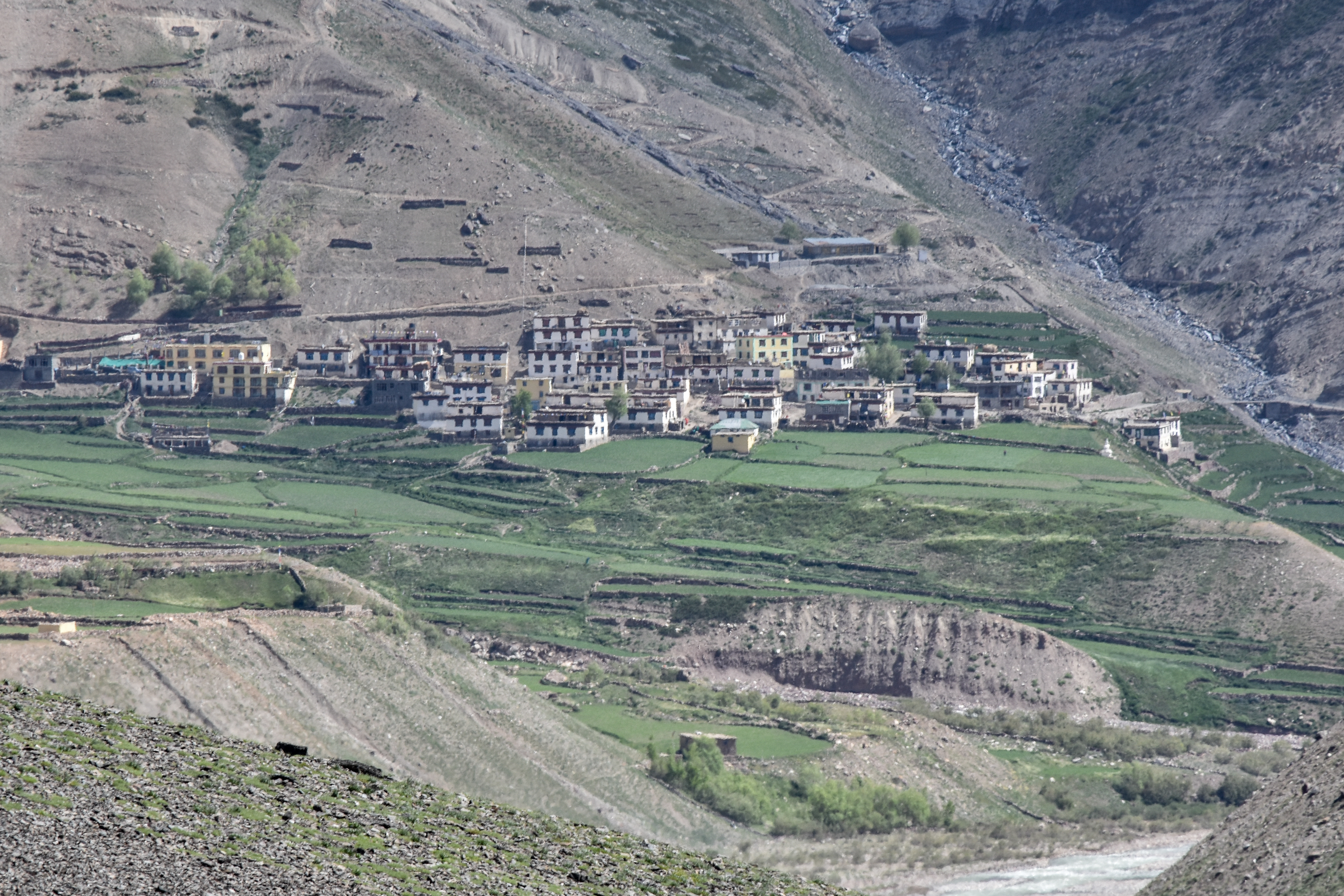
- Mud village above Pin river, Jun '18

- Location within Himachal Pradesh
- Coordinates: 31°57′33″N 78°01′57″E
- Country: India
- State: Himachal Pradesh
- District: Lahaul and Spiti
- Tehsil: Spiti

Government
  - Type: Panchayat
  - Body: Gram Panchayat, Sagnam

Area
  - Total: 0.776 km^{2} (0.300 sq mi)

Population (2011)
  - Total: 213
  - Density: 274/km^{2} (711/sq mi)

Languages
  - Official: Hindi
  - Native: Spiti Bhoti
- Time zone: UTC+5:30 (IST)
- Postal code: 172117

Mud (also known as Mudh and Muth) is a small village in the cold desert region of Spiti in Himachal Pradesh, India. Located at an altitude of 3,810 m (12,500 ft) on the left bank of the Pin River, a right bank tributary of the Spiti River, the village is nestled at the base of the Parbati range that towers almost vertically 1,600 m (5,200 ft) above. Mud is near the boundary of the Pin Valley National Park and is a convenient base for treks in the park, and to the neighbouring districts of Kullu and Kinnaur. It is the last village on the Spiti side of the Pin Parbati trek to Kullu and the Pin Bhaba trek to Kinnaur.

Mud became famous among geologists in the 1860s when the Moravian geologist Ferdinand Stoliczka discovered a major geological formation in the Himalayas that he named the Muth Succession, after Mud. This spurred many geologists to do fieldwork in the Pin Valley. The Muth Formation, as it is now known, has a thickness of 258–300 m (846–984 ft). Consisting of white quartz arenite, it is resistant to weathering and readily visible.

== History ==
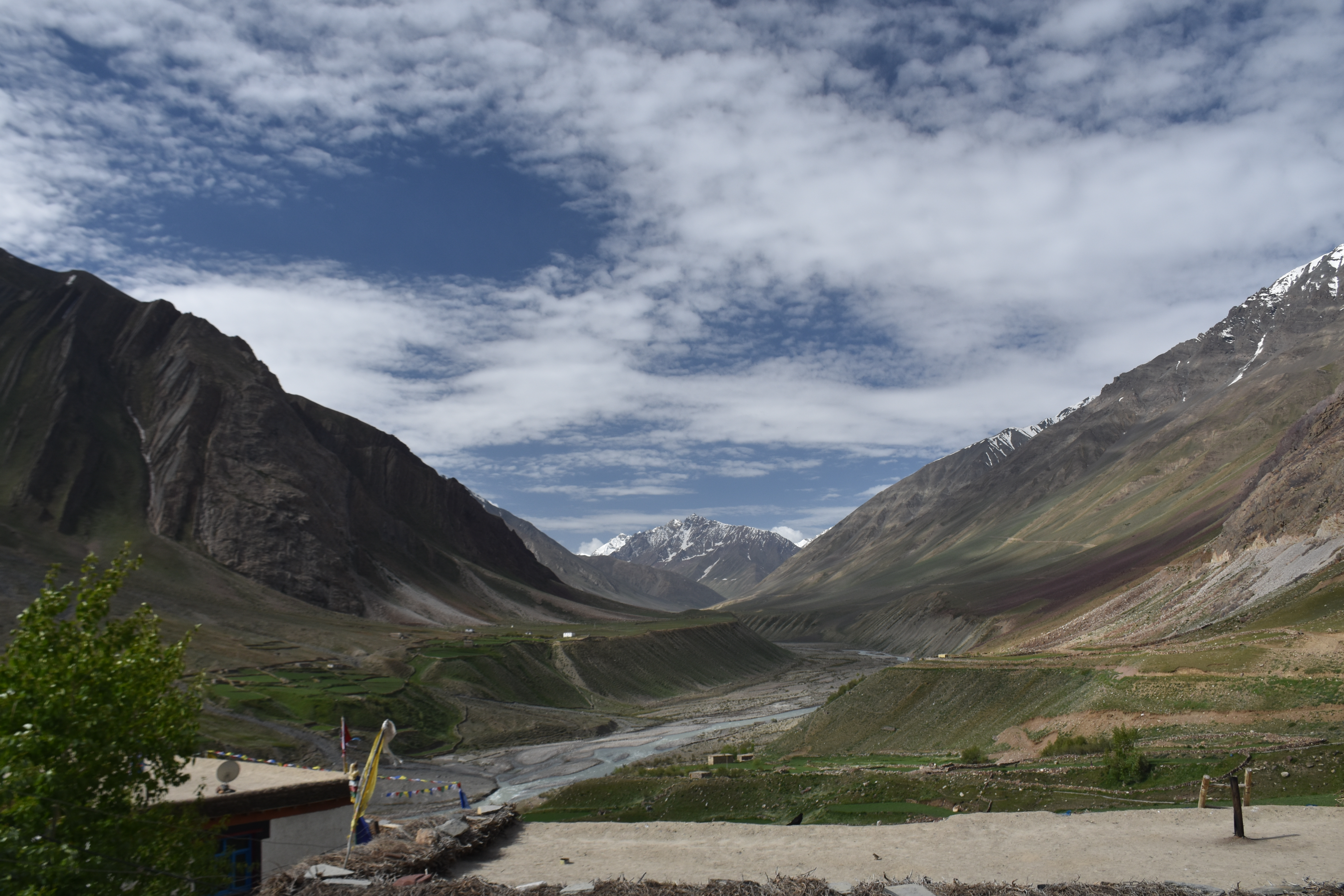
View up the Pin valley from Mud

Mud was mentioned by Ferdinand Stoliczka in a paper in the Memoirs of the Geological Survey of India, 1866. Stoliczka was a Moravian paleontologist who joined the Geological Survey of India in 1862. He made Mud the base for his fieldwork on the geology of the Western Himalayas and named an important geological rock layer stretching from Kashmir through Spiti to Nepal in the Western Himalayas, calling it the Mudh (Mud) Series. This remote village at the upper end of the Pin River Valley, surrounded by inhospitable mountains, thus attained prominence.

Spurred by Stoliczka's publication, other geologists visited Mud for fieldwork during the remainder of the 19th century. These included C. L. Griesbach (1880s), C. Diener (1890s), and H. H. Hayden (1899). Their research and publications confirmed the prominence of Mud in geology. Hayden renamed the Mudh Series to the Mudh Formation, a name that is still in use today. G. Fuchs wrote: "The pioneering work by Stoliczka, Griesbach, Von Krafft, Dlener, and Hayden has made Spiti famous as a classical geological area of the Himalaya, particularly of the Tethys or Tibetan Zone."

After a gap of many decades after Hayden's 1899 visit, in July – September 1978, an Indo-Austrian expedition led by G. Fuchs (Geological Survey of Austria) and D.K. Bhatt (Geological Survey of India) did fieldwork on the Mudh Formation in Mud and nearby places. In 1997–98, Erich Draganits, a PhD student at the University of Vienna did his fieldwork in Mud. Subsequently, Indian geologists Parcha and Pandey from the Wadia Institute of Himalayan Geology, Dehradun, visited in about 2011. These recent studies succeeded in firmly establishing the origins and age of the Mudh Formation.

== Geography ==
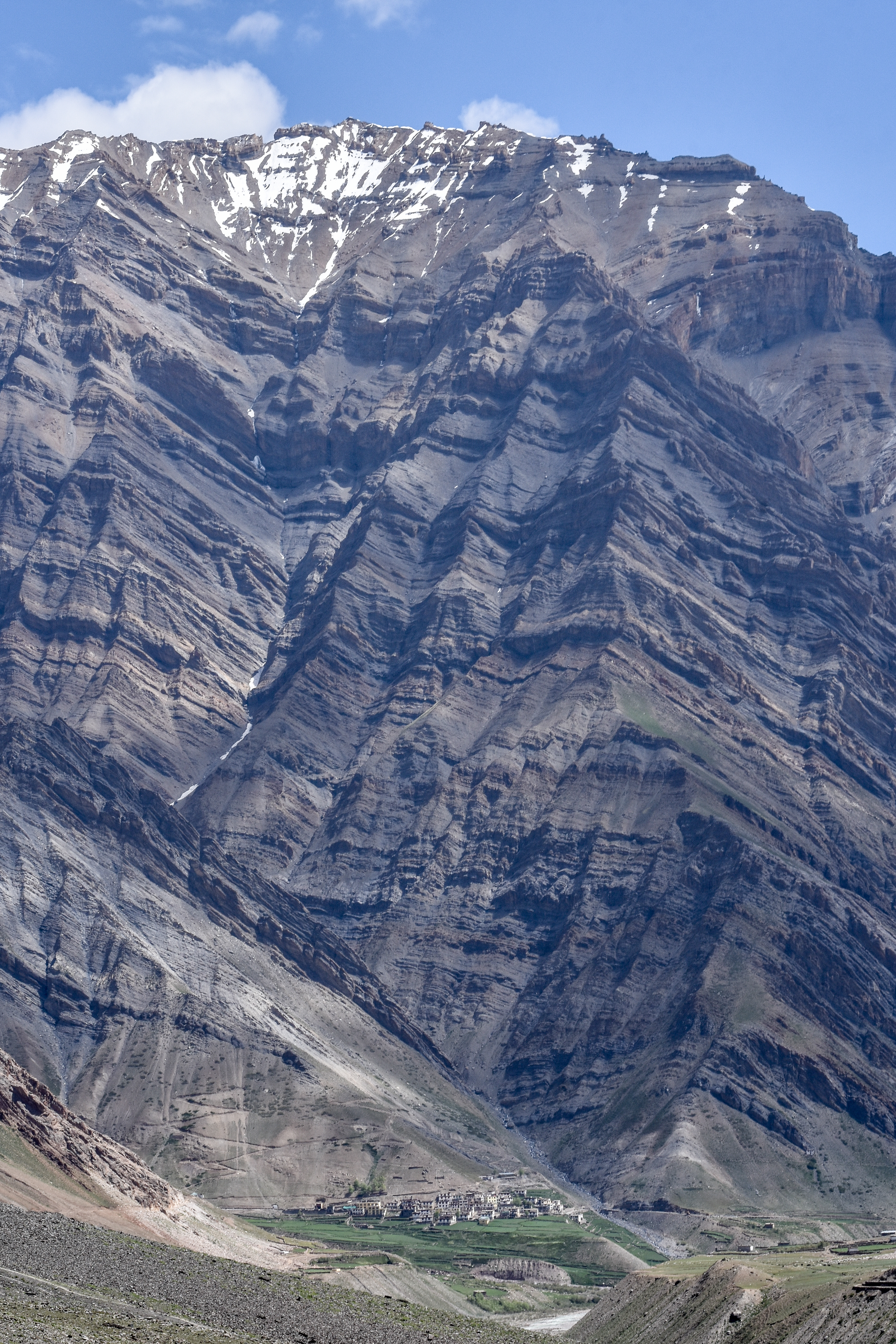
Rock strata towering 1,600 m (5,200 ft) above Mud

Mud is located on the left bank of the Pin River, which is a right bank tributary of the Spiti River. The village is at the base of the towering Pin Parbati range that separates Spiti from Kullu district. It is the first inhabited place encountered by travelers coming from Kullu valley via the Pin Parbati Pass and from Kinnaur via the Pin Bhaba Pass. The village is at a distance of 48 km (30 mi) from Kaza, Spiti. This is the route on NH-505 from Manali. From Tabo, en route on NH-505 from Shimla, the distance is 65 km (40 mi). The village covers an area of 77.6 ha (192 acres).

=== Climate ===
Spiti is a cold desert region with an annual rainfall of about 17 cm (6.7 in). The weather is mild from April to October. From May to June, the temperatures range between 15–20 °C (59–68 °F). During the winter, the temperature may drop to −20 °C (−4 °F).

=== Geology ===
Spiti is a high-altitude semi-desert. Over millennia, the Spiti River and its tributaries such as the Pin River, have cut deep gorges in the sedimentary strata uplifted during the formation of the Himalayas. With little rain or snow there is not much weathering of the steep valley sides. As vegetation is sparse, the rock strata in the steep cliffs are easily visible to the geologist, without excavation or drilling. These favourable conditions for observation attracted geologists to the Pin Valley starting with Stoliczka in the 1860s. In the mountain sides near Mud, Stoliczka identified a number of layers or successions, one of which he named as the Muth succession. This was later renamed as the Muth System by Hayden (1908) and as the Muth Formation by Srikantia (1981). Other formations, visible near Mud, that occur above and below the Muth Formation are given in the table.

Stratigraphic Formations in the Western Himalayas
Formation	Geologic Era (mya)	Dated Fossils (mya)
Kuling	Permian (299–252)	
Lipak	Late Devonian (387–359)	387.7–382.7
Muth	Early Devonian (419–393)	
Pin	Late Ordovician – Late Silurian	433–423
Thango	Early – Late Ordovician	
Haimanta	Late Proterozoic – Middle Cambrian	

The Muth Formation is readily observed in the Farakah Section, north-west of Mud village. It is also very well exposed in Zanskar, Lahaul, Spiti, Kinnaur, Garhwal and in the Nepal Himalayas. It consists mostly of hard, white or slightly greenish quartz arenite 258 to 300 m (846 to 984 ft) thick, with an 11 to 15 m (36 to 49 ft) thick layer of dolomite near the top. The white colour and resistance to weathering make it easy to observe.

It exhibits current bedding, ripple marks and burrows. These indicate that it originated from coastal sediments deposited in a wave-dominated barrier island system in the Tethys Sea. The sedimentary rock was transformed by metamorphosis into quartz during the tectonic collision.

The quartz arenite rock strata were formed under high temperatures and/or pressures. Hence, body fossils did not survive. Only inchnofossils (i.e. fossil traces such as burrows and tracks), are found. The neighbouring formations, Pin (lower, i.e. older) and Lipak (upper, i.e. younger), have body fossils that are accurately dated. The trace fossils in the Mudh Formation and the dates of the neighbouring formations have been used to approximately date the Mudh Formation to the Early Devonian (419 – 393 mya).

== Demographics and amenities ==
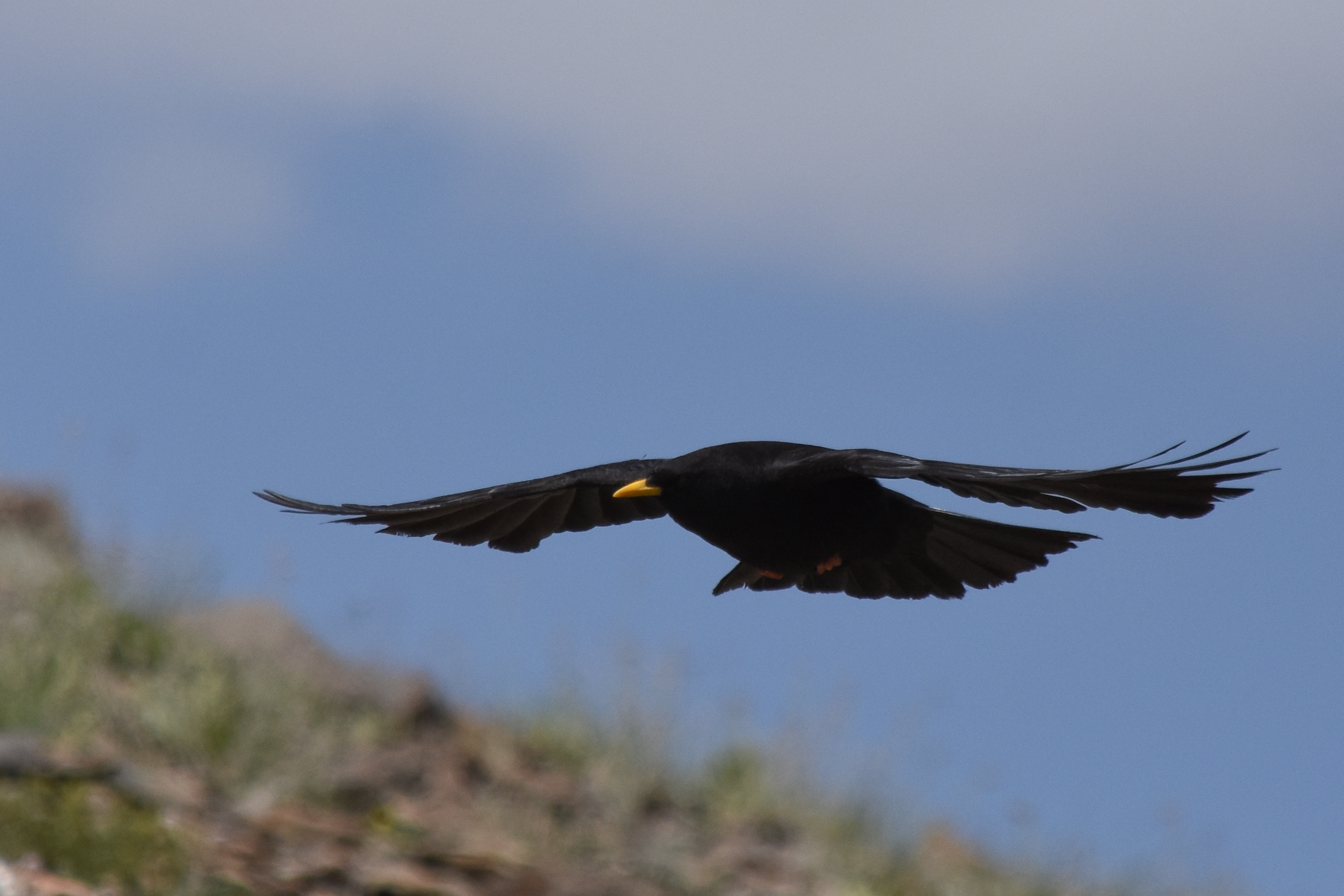
Yellow-billed chough near Mud

The population as of the 2011 Census was 213 (females: 113 (53%), males: 100 (47%)), with 45 households. The literacy rate among females is 54% and among males is 81%. The majority of the population are Scheduled Tribes comprising 96.2%, while Scheduled Castes comprise 1.88%. The language spoken in Spiti is Bhoti.

Mud is a village in the Sagnam Gram Panchayat. A government primary and middle school caters to children of the village. The village has a branch post office. The nearest full-service sub post office including international speed post is located at Sagnam, a distance of 14 km (8.7 mi).

== Places of interest ==
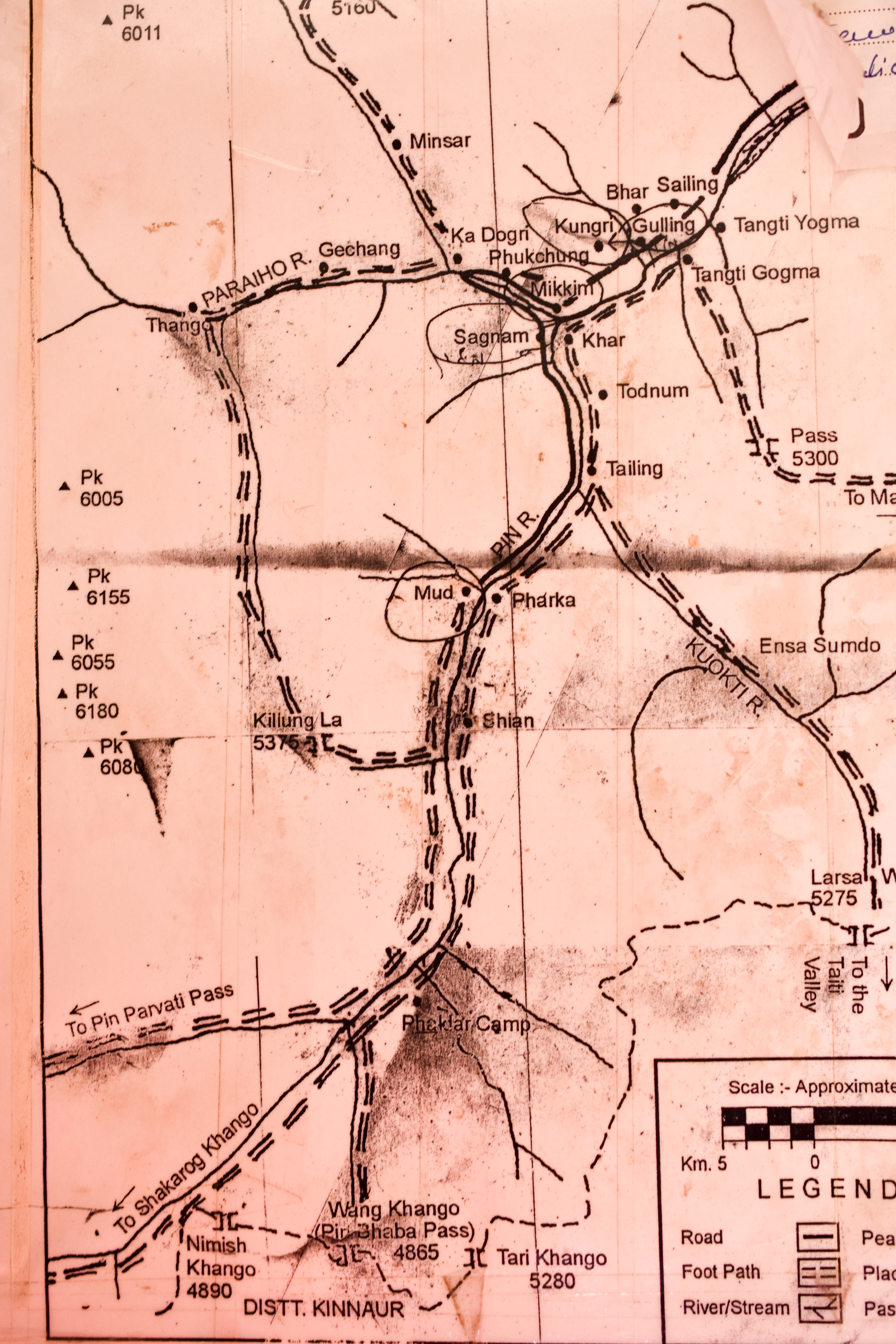
Trekking routes from Mud

Mud is a convenient base for visiting the Pin Valley National Park. Trails from Mud head north and west to the National Park, west to Kullu district via the Pin Parbati Pass, and south to Kinnaur district via the Pin Bhaba Pass.

The Pin Valley is a cold desert with alpine pasture or dry alpine scrub forest. Located at a high altitude with the upper reaches being largely unexplored, the area is home to several endangered species including the snow leopard. About 20 species of birds and animals are found in the National Park, some of which may be seen in the Pin valley near Mud. These include Ibex, Chhumurthi horse, Bharal, Red fox, Marten, Weasel, Pika, Snow Cock, Bearded vulture, Chukor, Golden Eagle, Griffon, Yellow-billed Chough, Raven etc.

Mud has two Buddhist nunneries, meditation caves and shelters. These belong to the Nyingmapa school, the oldest of the four major schools of Tibetan Buddhism. These are located on the Killung Nala, a small stream that meets the Pin River at Mud.

Mud is the last village on the trekking trails to the Kullu valley and to Kinnaur district. Both routes start along the left bank of the Pin River. After about 12 km (7.5 mi) the trail reaches Chhochhden Camp at the confluence of 3 nallahs. The ruins of Lyungti Khar, a fort built by the Kullu Rajas, is nearby. One trail heads west towards the Pin Parbati Pass (elev. 5,319 m (17,451 ft) and down the Parbati valley to Manikaran and Kullu. This trek usually takes 5 to 7 days.

The other trail continues south from Chhochhden Camp to the Pin Bhaba Pass (elev. 4,890 m (16,040 ft) and on to Kaphnu in Kinnaur, a total distance of 50 km (31 mi). Kaphnu is 18 km (11 mi) from NH 5 which runs along the Satluj River to Shimla. This trek takes 4 to 5 days for the 50 km (31 mi) distance. Harish Kapadia reported that local people traveling to Shimla for business or studies would prefer the short trek over the Pir Bhaba Pass to the uncertain 254 km (158 mi) road journey via Tabo.

== Transport ==
During the summer, public buses and private vans ply regularly from Kaza to Mikkim and Mud in the Pin valley. During the winter, buses do not ply to the Pin valley. Then, the approach to Mud is via private vehicle and foot from Attargo bridge off NH-505, a distance of 33 km (21 mi).

In early 2022, the Government of Himachal Pradesh approved construction of a new road connecting the Satluj Valley, Kinnaur District to the Spiti Valley via Mud. The new 72 km (45 mi) road will run from Kafnu (NH-5) in Kinnaur to Mud, connecting to NH-505 near Atargu Bridge on the Spiti river. The new bypass will reduce the 460 km (290 mi) distance from Shimla to Kaza by 105 km (65 mi). This will open up the Pin Valley National Park, Mud and the Spiti Valley to tourism. Bhaba Pass Tunnel, under the Bhaba Pass connects the Bhaba Valley on the Kinnaur side with the Pin valley on the Spiti side, is planned. See also tunnels in North West India.

== Accommodation ==
There are a few home stays in Mud, the oldest being Tara House Home Stay.

== Gallery ==
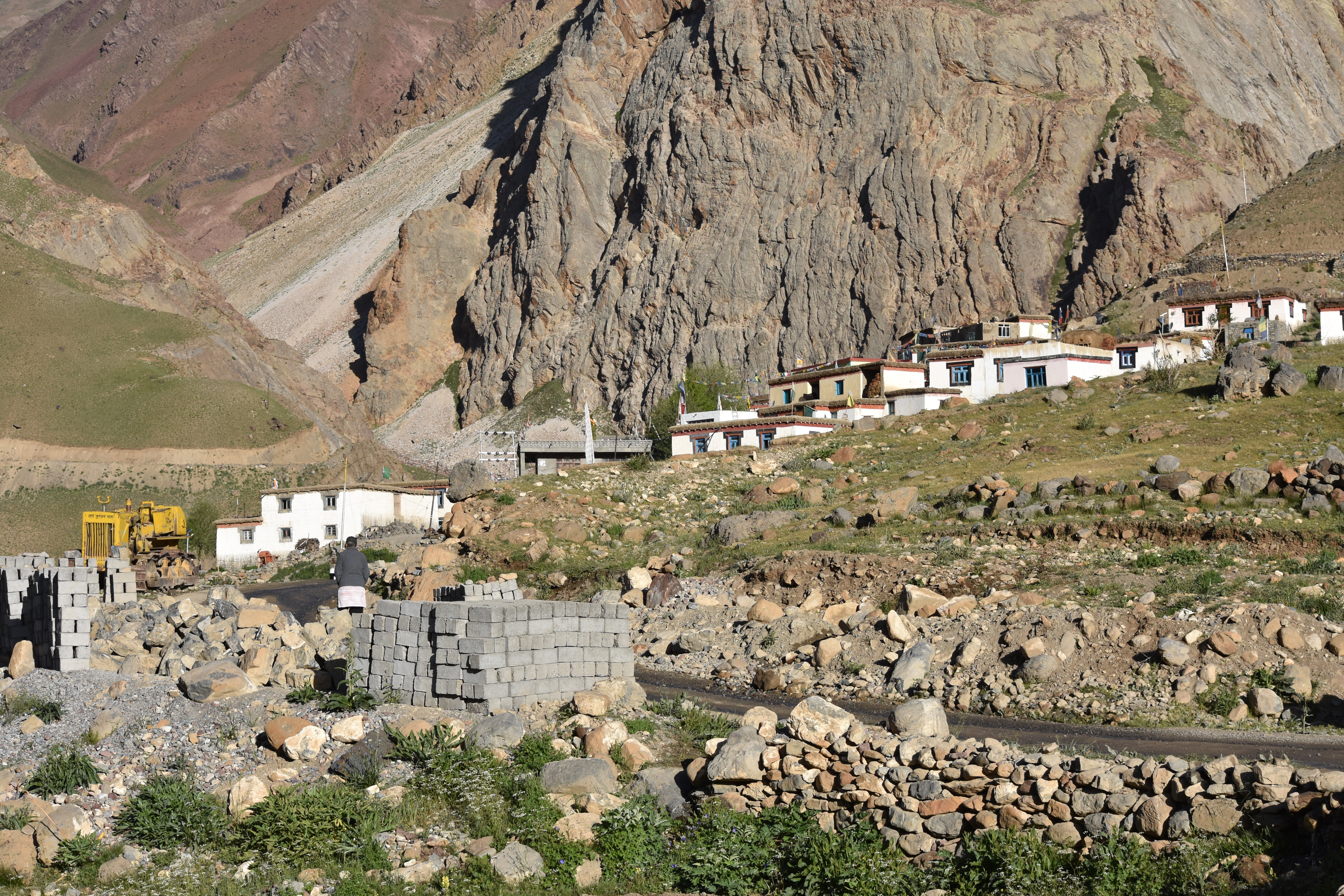
Road from Kaza entering Mud Village

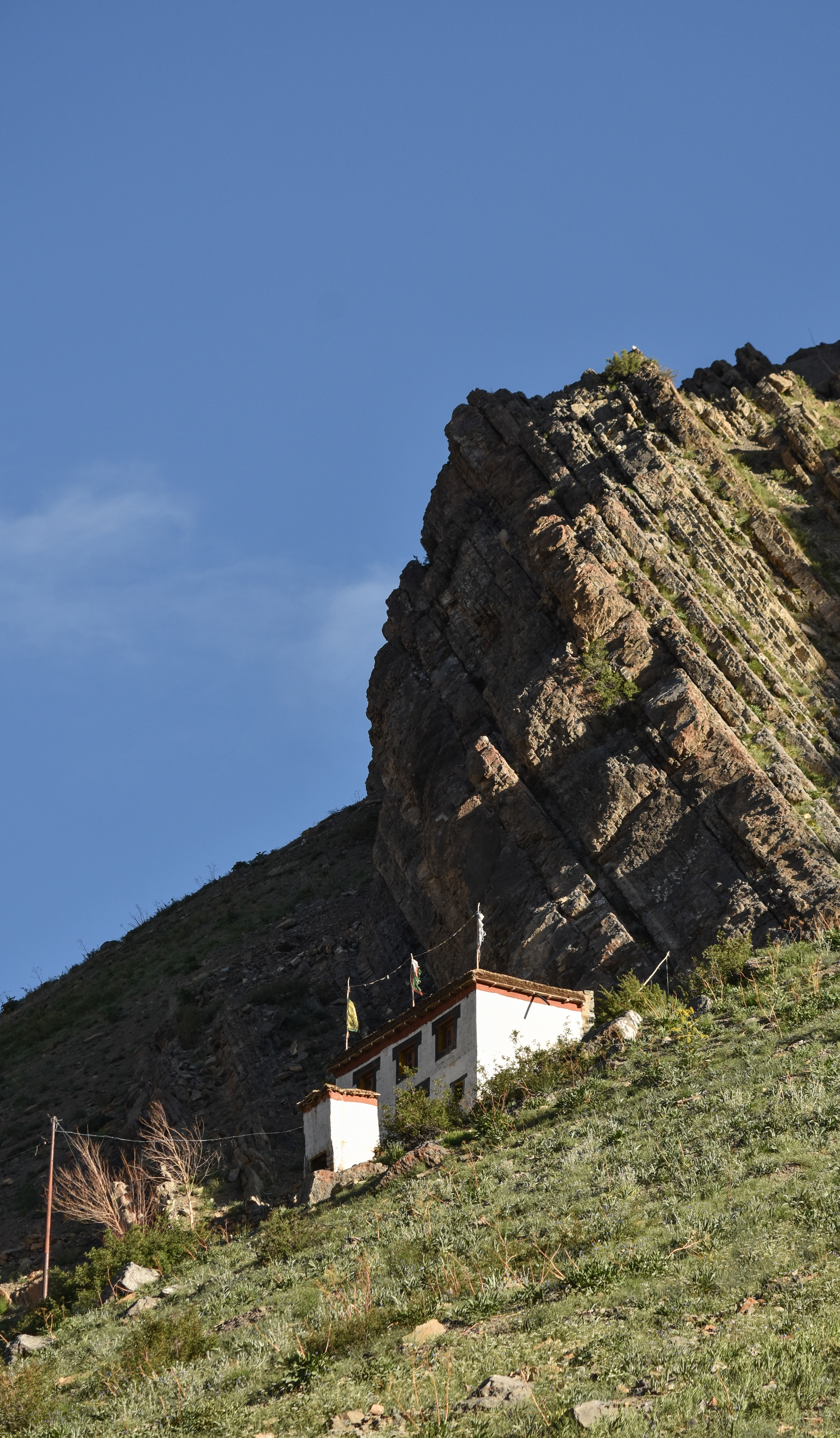
Nyingma Monastery, Mud Village, Spiti, Himachal Pradesh

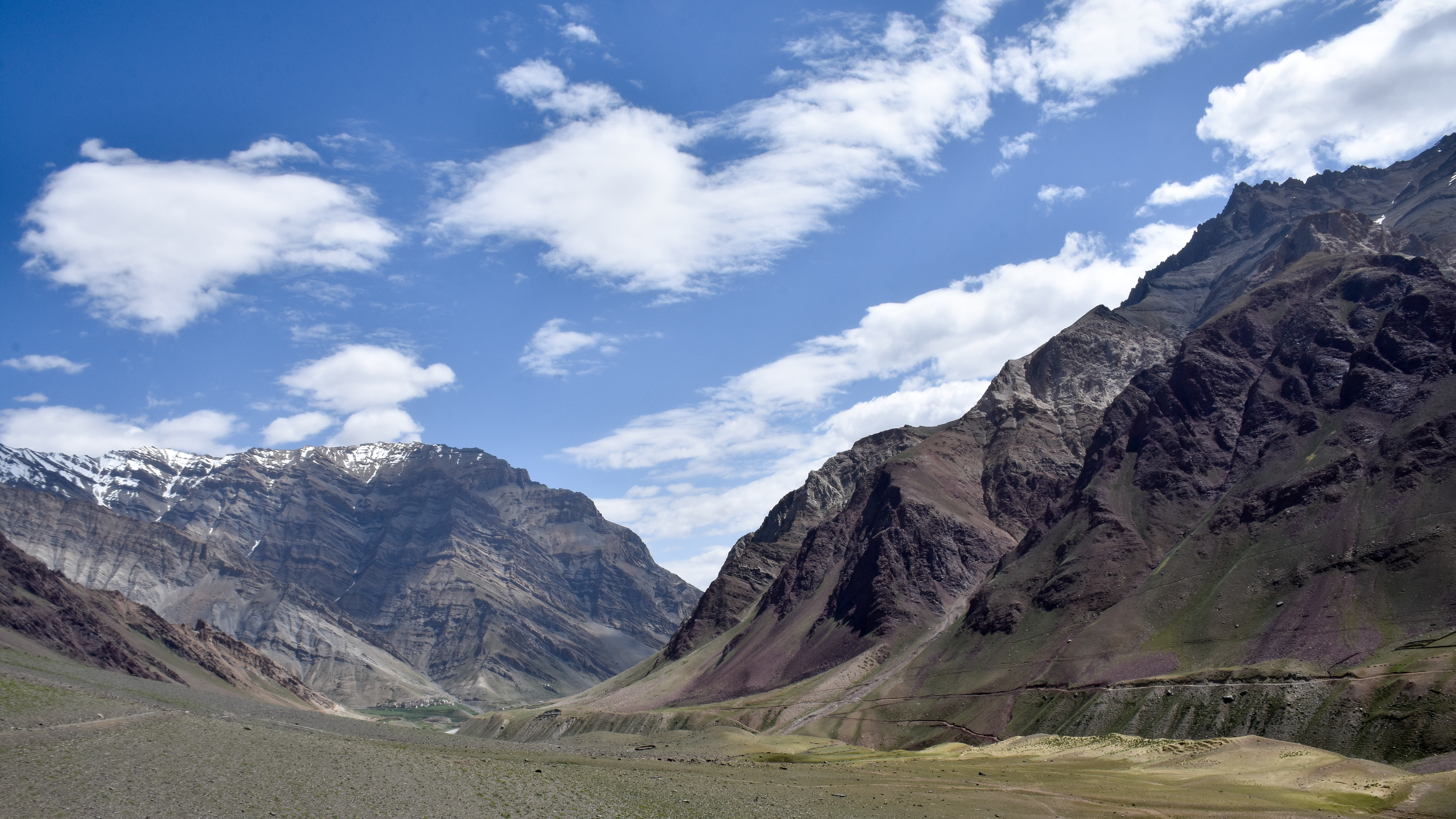
View Down the Pin Valley to Mud Village

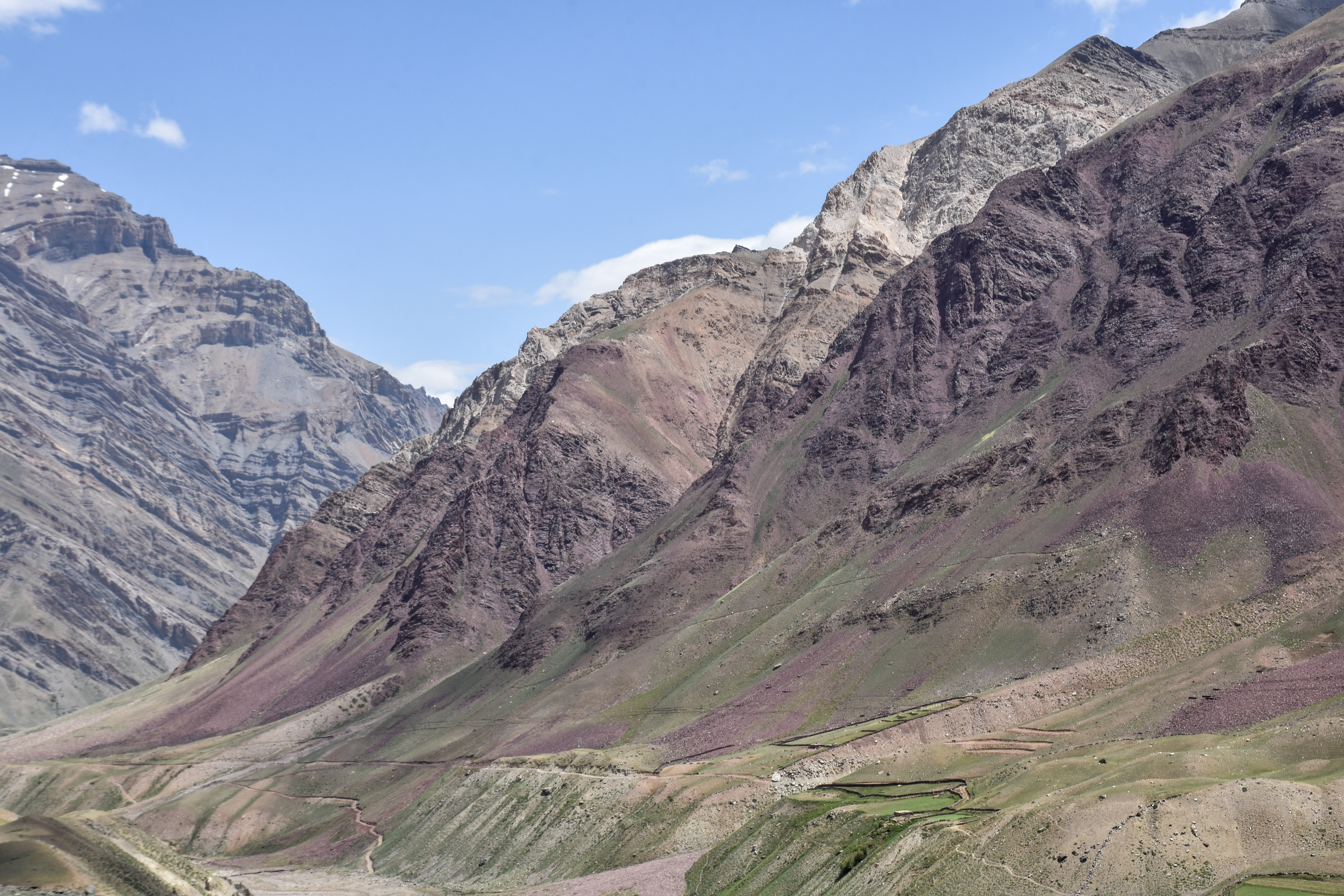
Right bank of Pin River looking towards Mud Village

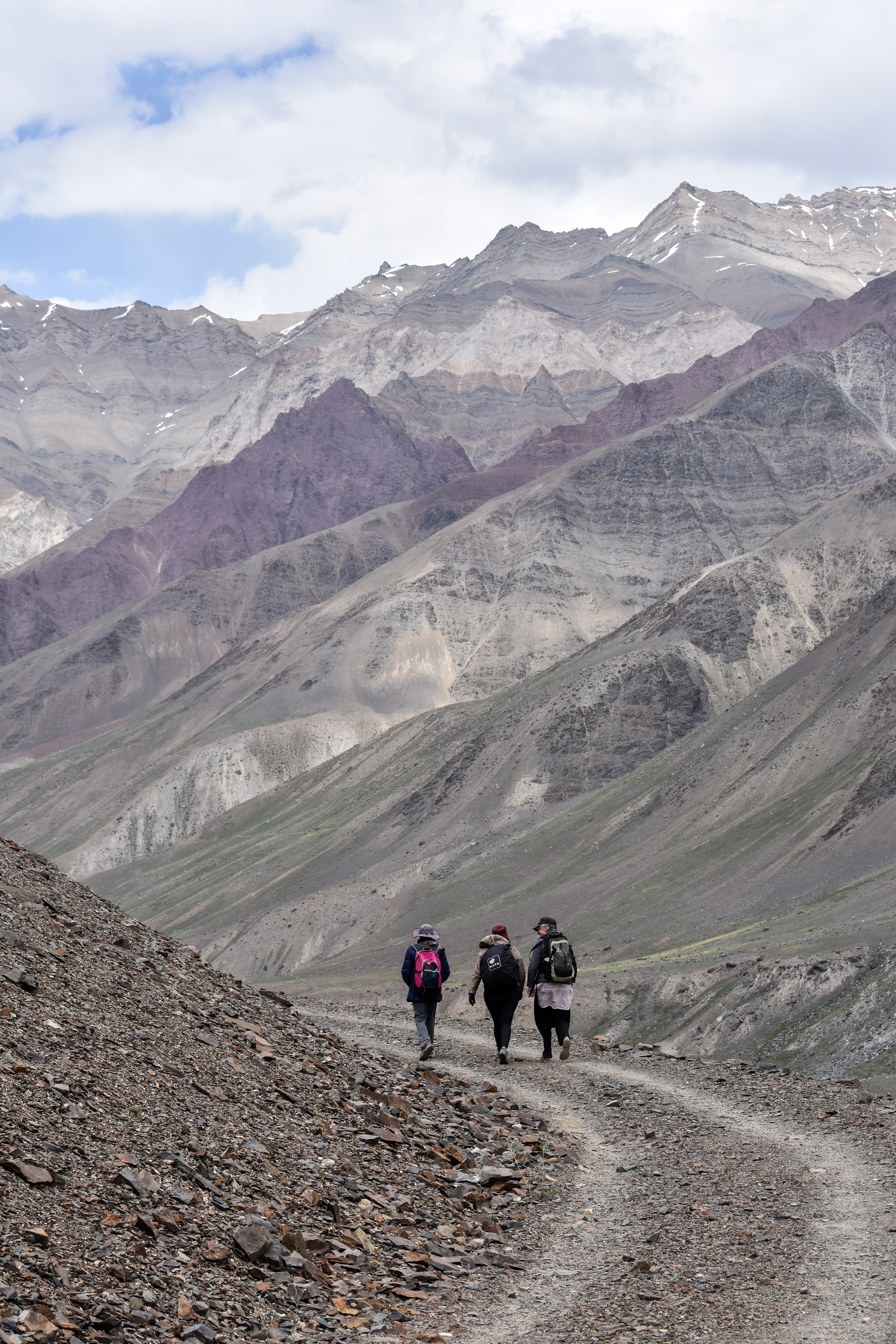
Hikers approach Mud Village on Left Bank of Pin River

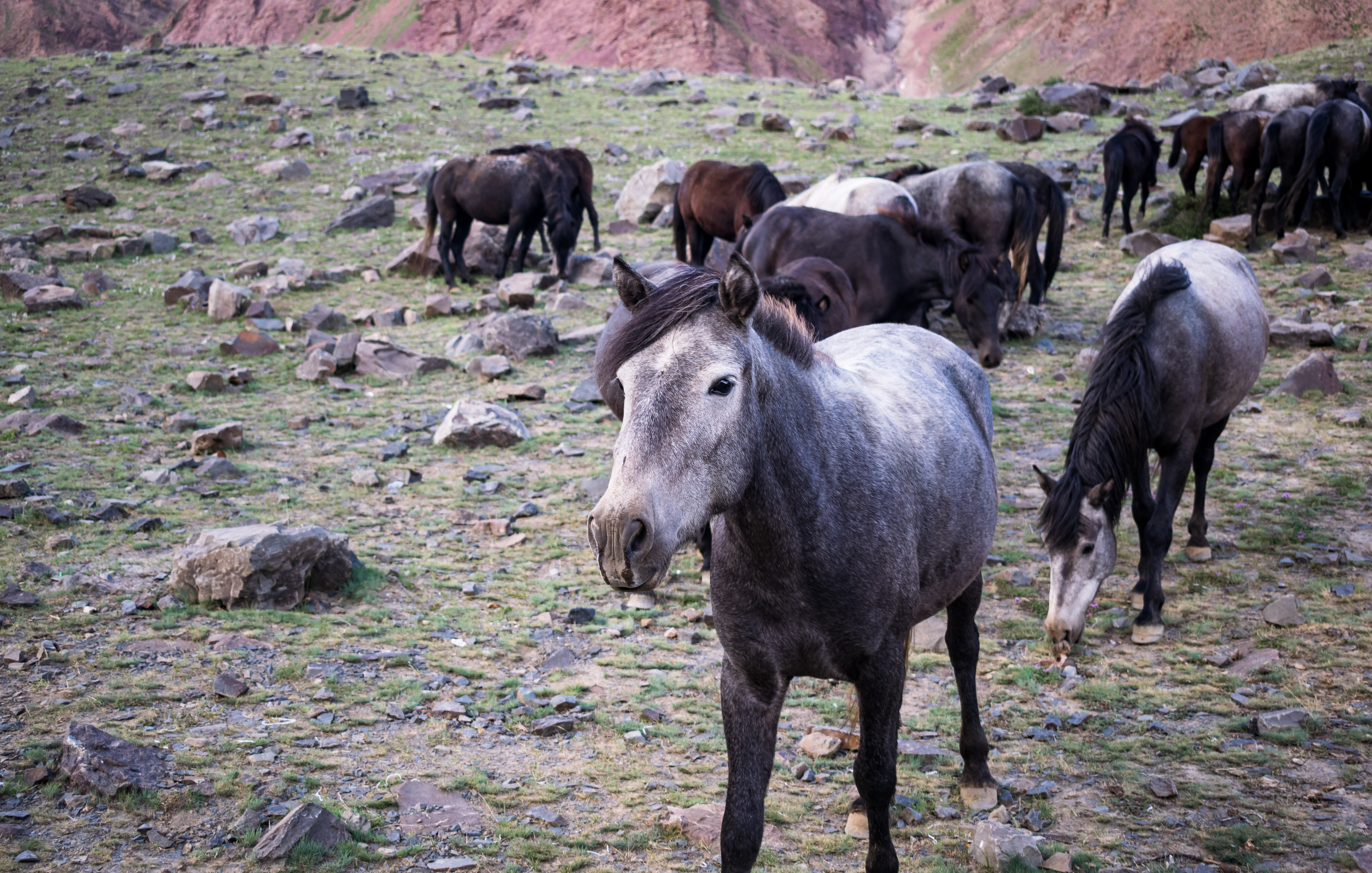
Chhumurthi Horses in a field in Mud Village

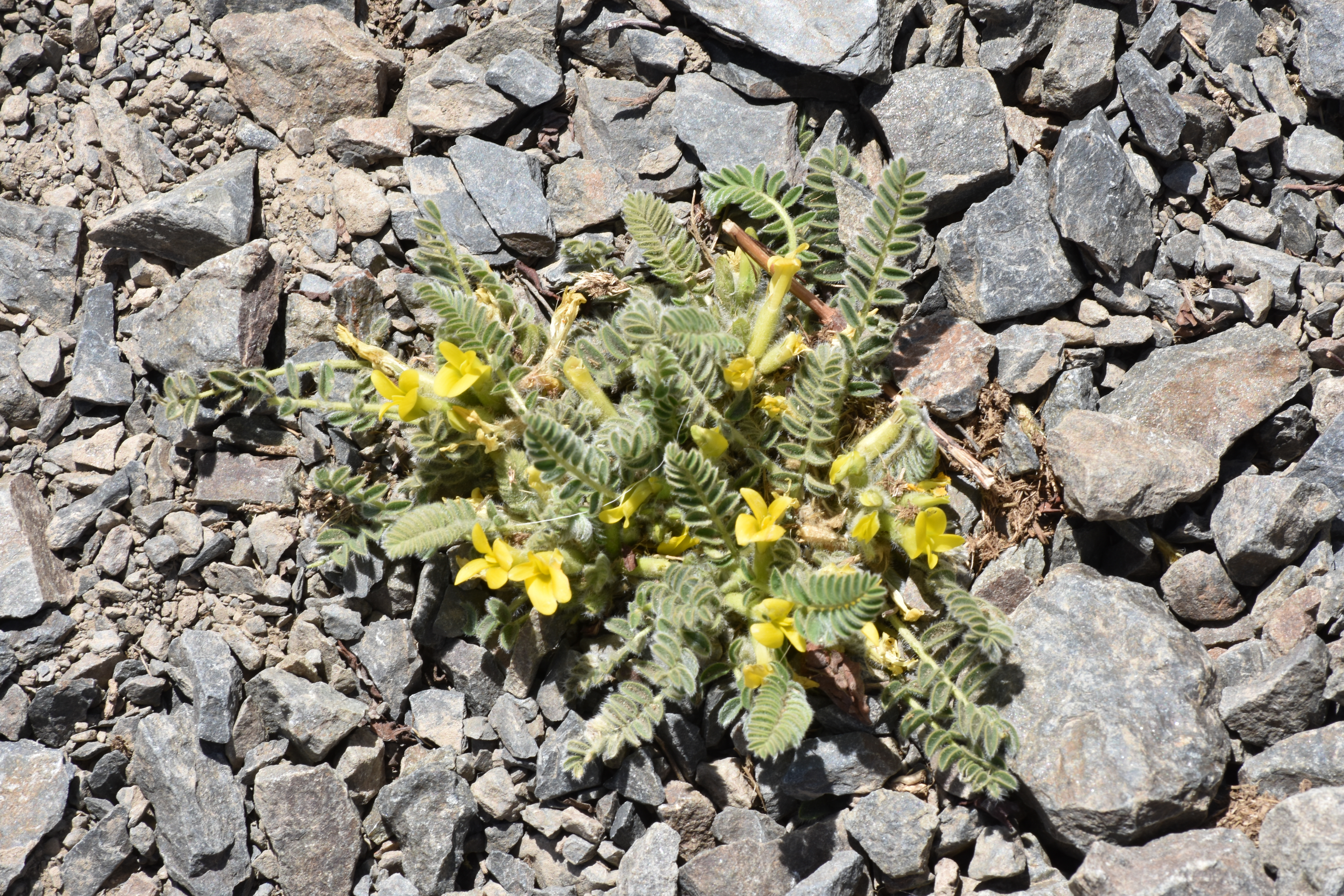
Yellow Wildflowers, Sparse Alpine Vegetation, Pin Valley, Spiti, Himachal Pradesh, June 2018

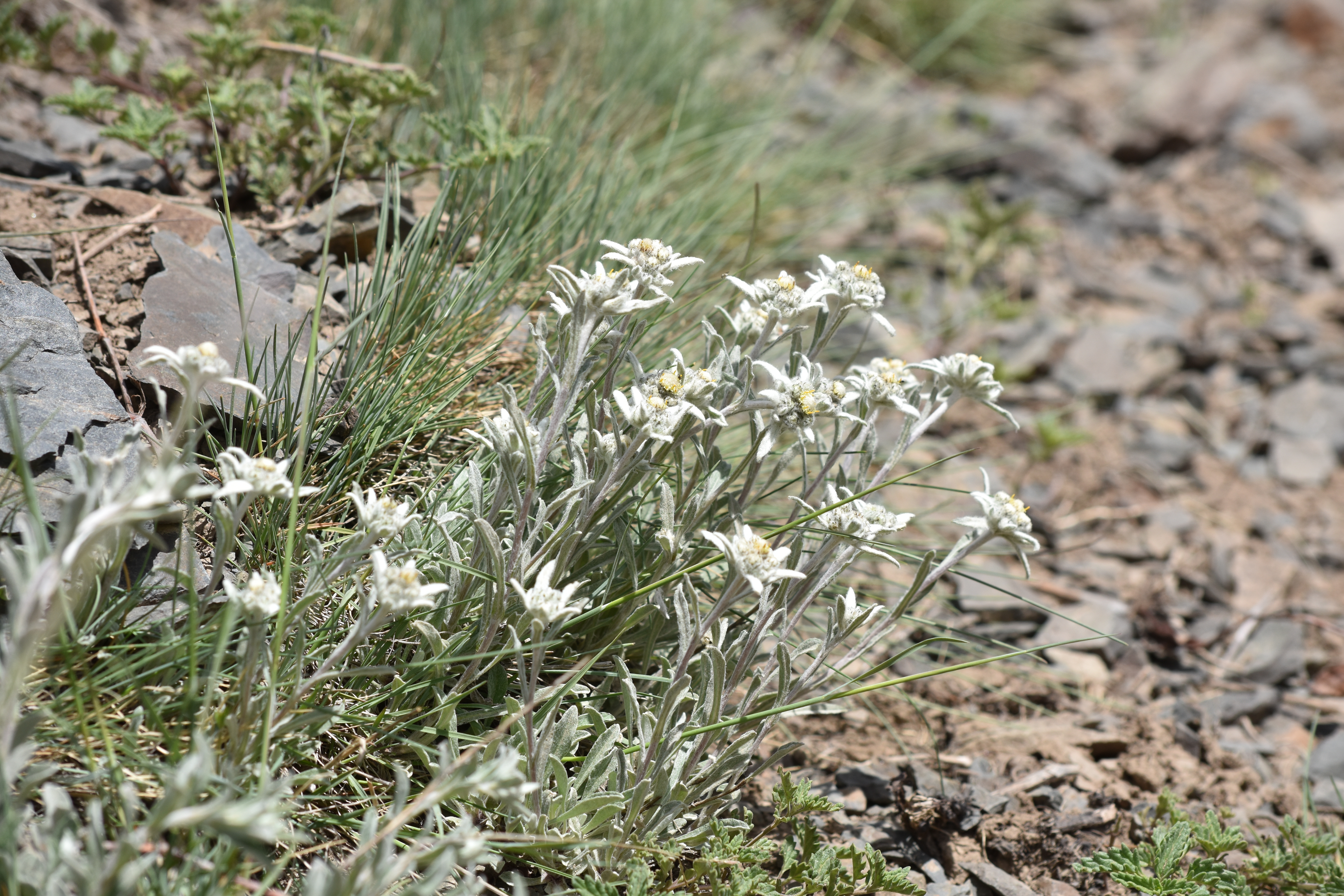
White Wildflowers, Sparse Alpine Vegetation, Pin Valley, Spiti, Himachal Pradesh, June 2018

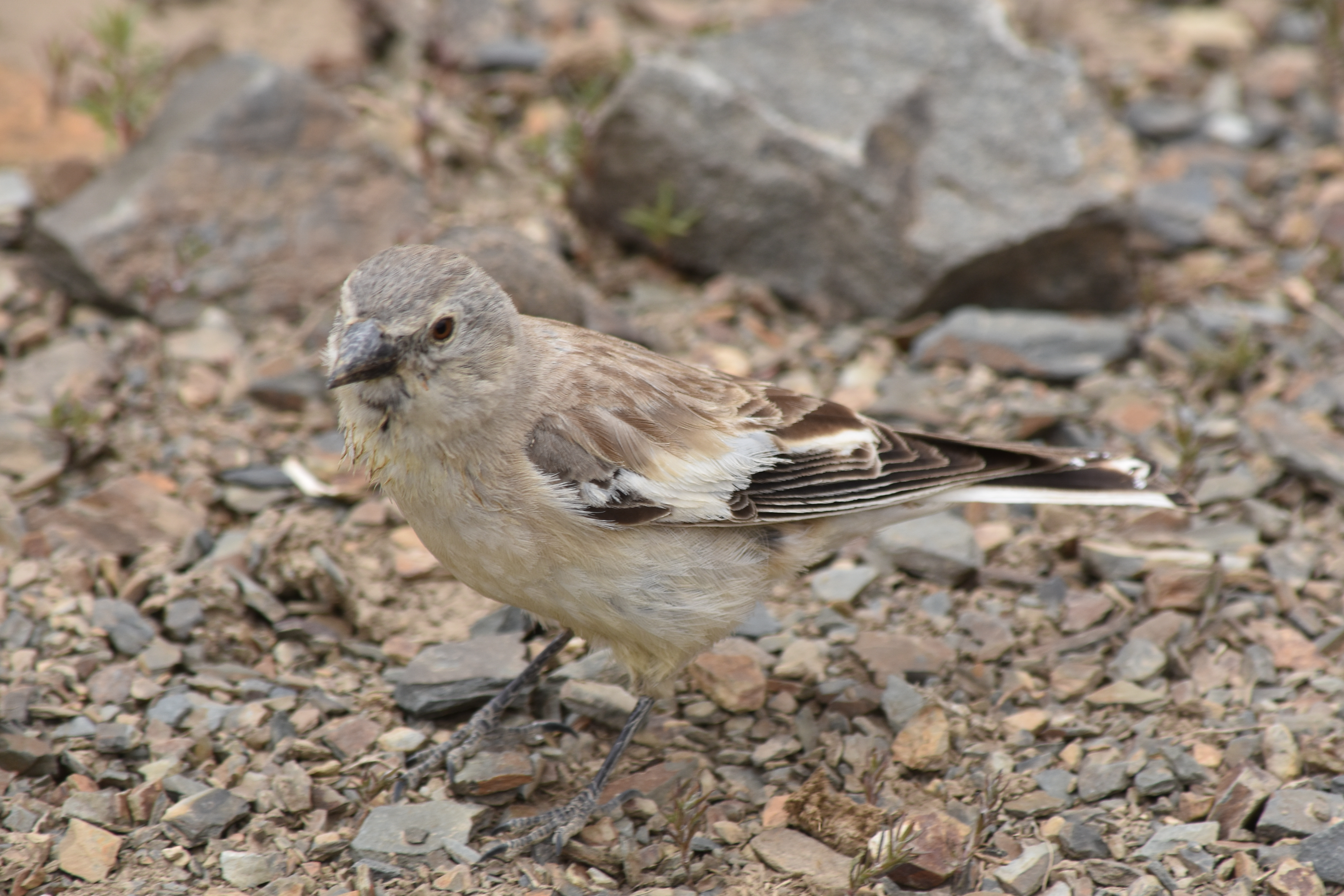
Brandt's Mountain Finch, Pin Valley, Spiti, Himachal Pradesh, June 2018

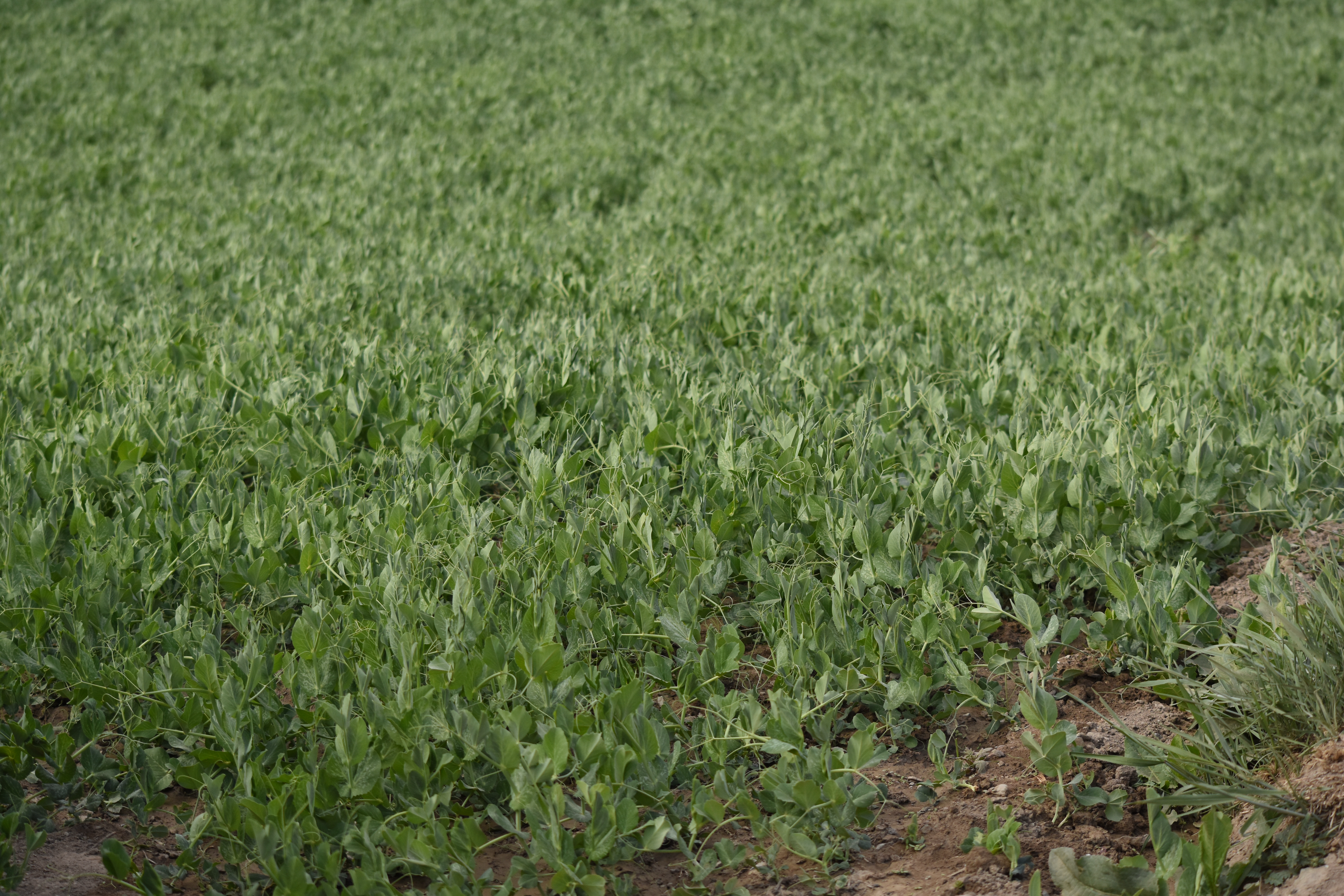
Field of Pea Plants in Mud Village, Spiti, Himachal Pradesh, June 2018

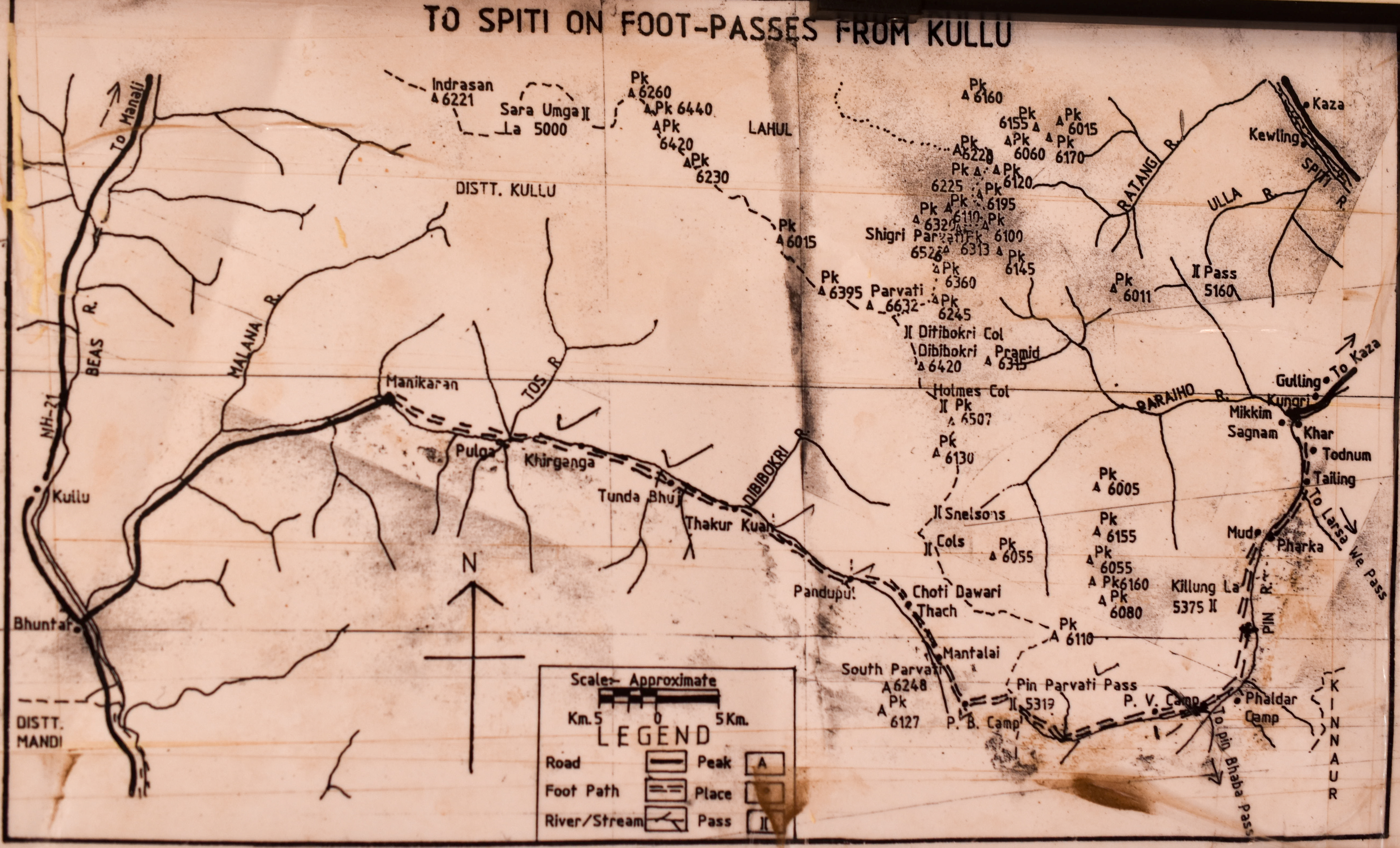
Map Passes Trails from Mud Village, Spiti to Kullu via the Pin Parbati Pass

== See also ==
- Pin Bhaba Pass
- Pin Parbati Pass
- Pin Valley National Park
