= Bhaba Valley =

Valley in Himachal Pradesh, India

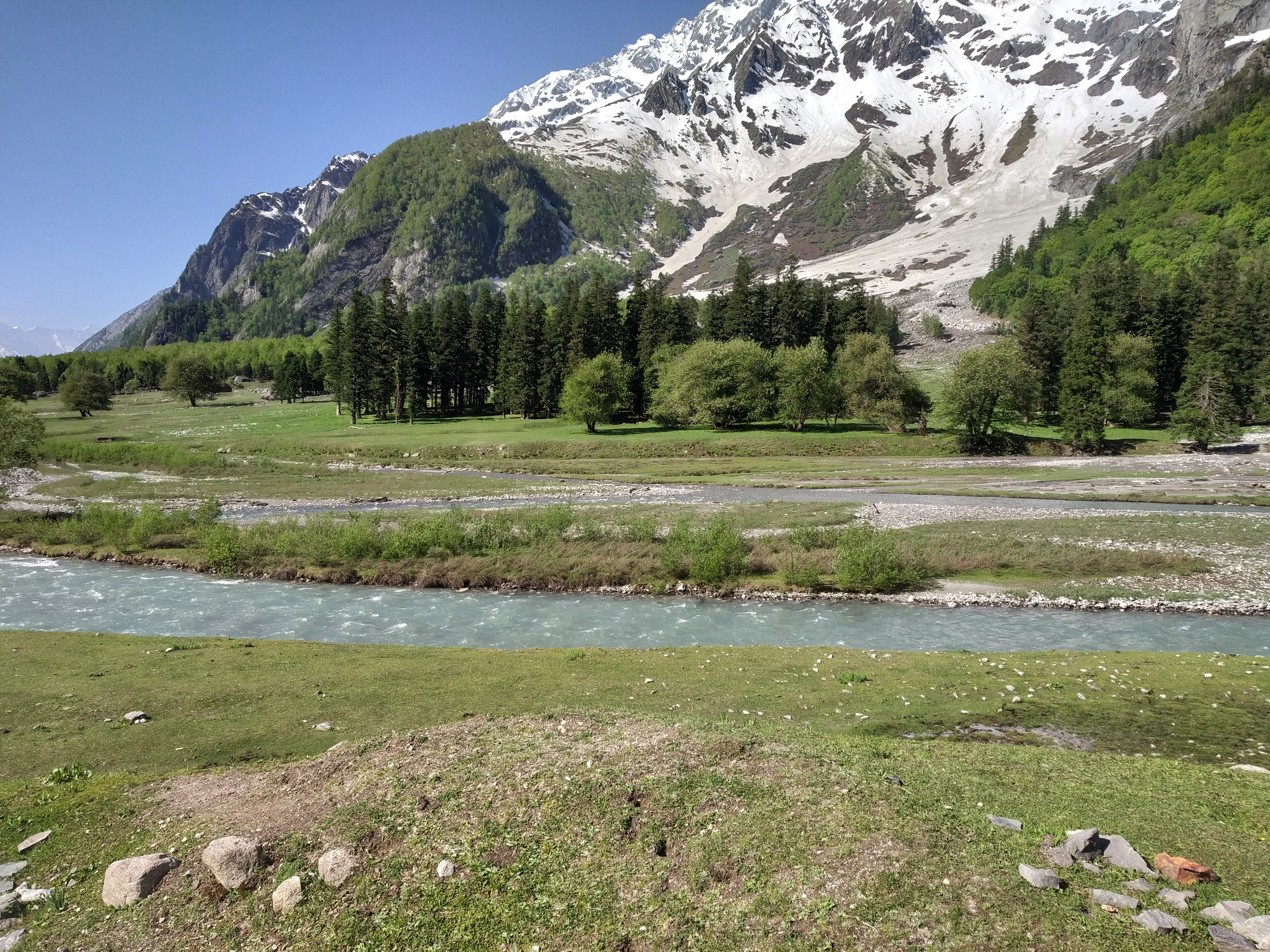
- Floor elevation: 2,200–6,000 m (7,200–19,700 ft)

Geography
- State/Province: Himachal Pradesh
- District: Kinnaur
- Borders on: Satluj Valley; Spiti Valley
- Mountain range: Himalaya & Zanskar Range
- River: Wangyur River

The Bhaba Valley (also known as Wangpo in the local Kinnauri language) is a valley in the northern Indian state of Himachal Pradesh. It is formed by the Wangyur river in the district of Kinnaur, which originates near Bhaba Pass. The Wangtu bridge is the gateway to the valley. It is 235 km from Shimla, is surrounded by Tibet in the east.

There are 17 villages within the valley. These villages are in turn divided into six Panchayats: Katgaon, Yangpa 1, Yangpa 2, Kraba, Kafnu and Shango. Most of the valley's inhabitation is in Katgaon village.

The Bhaba Pass connects the Bhaba Valley on the Kinnaur side with the Pin valley on the Spiti side. Another tourist attraction is Shivalinga, situated on the peak of Mount Kinnar Kailash.

Occasional avalanche, landslides and blizzards occur in the Bhaba Valley area. In March 2024, three labourers from Jharkhand were killed in an avalanche.

In July 2017, Himachal Pradesh chief Minister Vidarbha Singh said that he would initiate a Kaza-Mudh-Bhaba road through Pin Valley connecting Spiti to reduce the distance from Shimla to about 90 km. The cost of the proposed project was estimated to cost Rs. 80 crore in 2015.

== Religion ==
Despite being geographically situated in the Lower Kinnaur region, the Bhabha Valley has a predominantly Buddhist population. The valley also has a longstanding tradition of worship of the local deity Bhabha Maheshwar, reflecting the religious traditions of the region. Buddhist and Hindu religious traditions coexist in the valley, with elements of both traditions forming part of the local cultural and religious life.

== Ammunition depot ==
In November 2024, the state government has identified 50 acres at Mulling in the Bhaba valley of Kinnaur to relocate Army’s ammunition depot and obtained 'no objection certificates' from five panchayats. As such the construction of the silt flush tunnel of 450 MW Shong Tong Hydroelectric Project was halted after the Indian Army has moved court against the construction. The Works of Army Act, 1903, does not permit any other activity within a 1,000 metre distance of the ammunition depots.

== Gallery ==
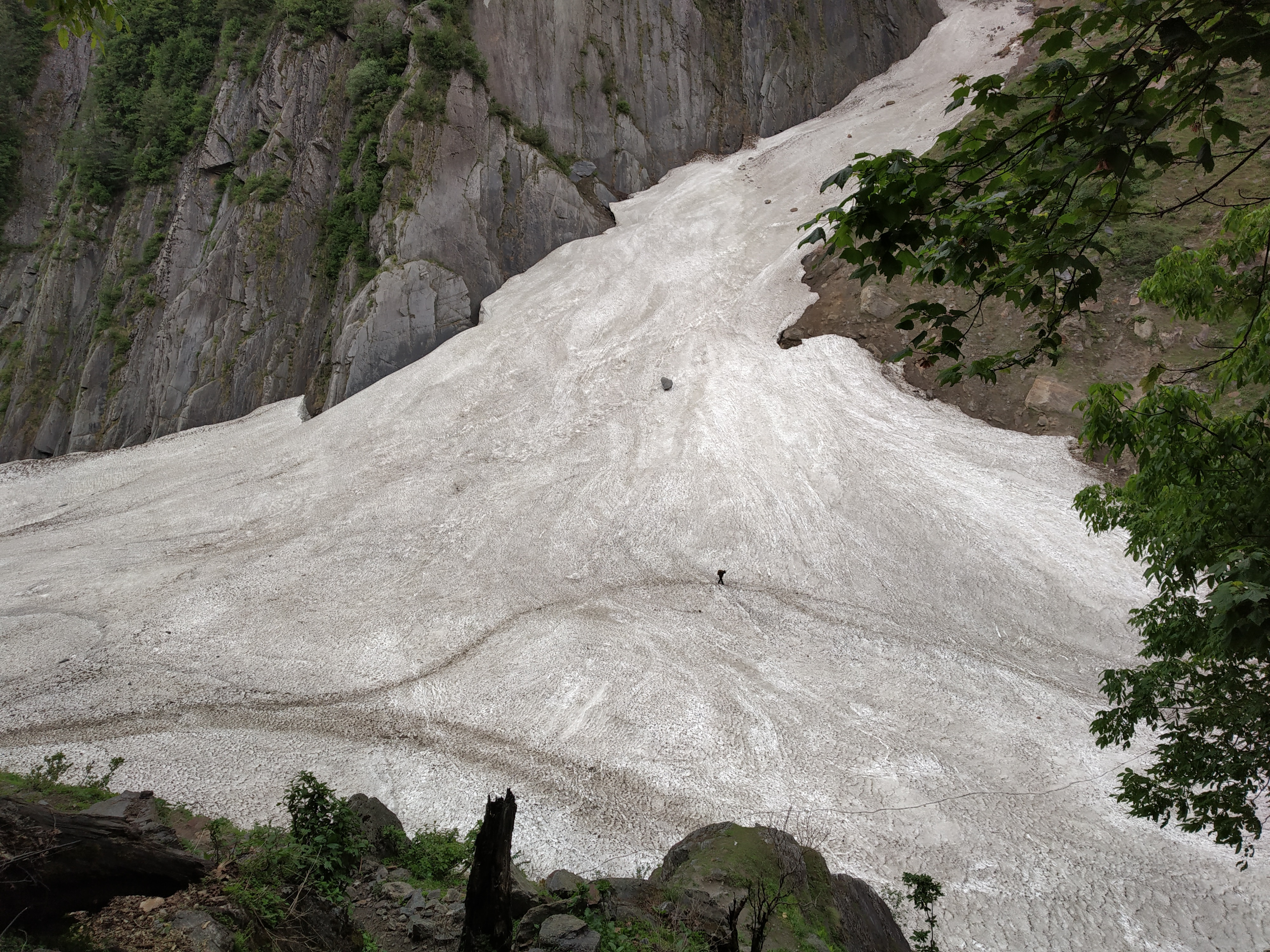
Avalanche site
