= Pin Valley National Park =

National park in India

- IUCN category II (national park)
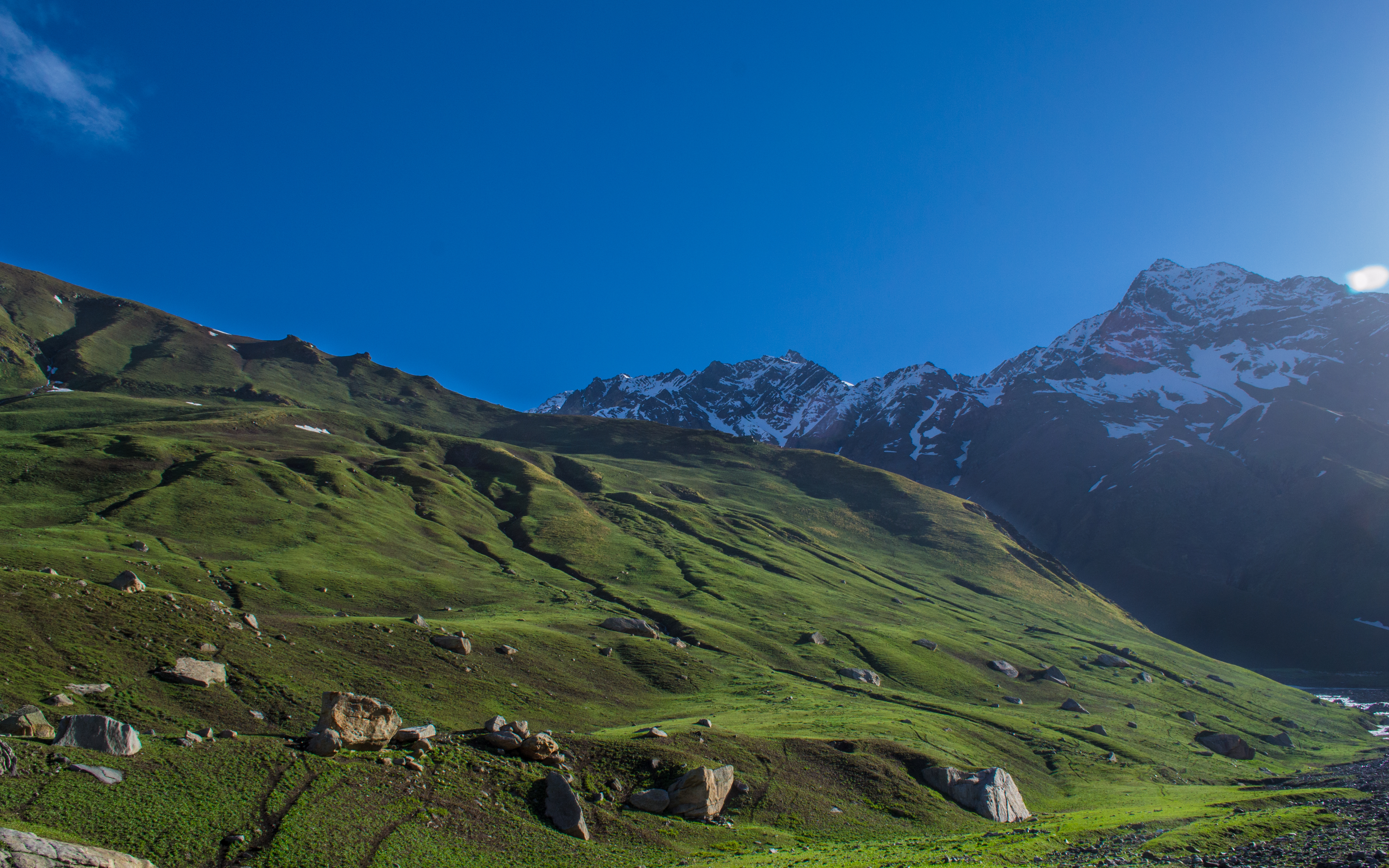

- Location within Himachal Pradesh
- Interactive map of Pin Valley National Park
- Nearest town: Kaza
- Coordinates: 32.00°N 77.88°E
- Area: 675 km^{2} (261 sq mi)
- Established: 1958

Pin Valley National Park is a National park of India located in the Spiti Valley of Lahaul and Spiti district and Bhaba Valley of Kinnaur district, in the state of Himachal Pradesh. It is located in far northern India. It is part of Cold Desert (biosphere reserve).

== History ==
Steeped in historical and present day Buddhist Tibetan culture, the area has many Tibetan Buddhist influences, evident architecturally in monasteries and stupas, and in the daily living of its residents and lamas.

Pin Valley National Park, with an area of 675 square kilometres (261 sq mi) was established by India in 1987.

== Geography ==
The park is located in the desert habitat of the Spiti Valley, within the Cold Desert Biosphere Reserve, in the Himalayas region. Spreading south of Dhankar Gompa near the Tibetan border to Bhaba Valley of Kinnaur, the park marks the border between the formerly separate districts of Lahaul and Spiti and Kinnaur. The elevation of the park ranges from about 3,500 metres (11,500 ft) near Ka Dogri to more than 6,000 metres (20,000 ft) at its highest point.

== Ecology ==
With its snow laden unexplored higher reaches and slopes, the park forms a natural habitat for a number of endangered animals including snow leopards, Siberian ibex, Bharal (Himalayan blue sheep), red foxes, weasels, martens, pikas and others.

=== Flora and fauna ===
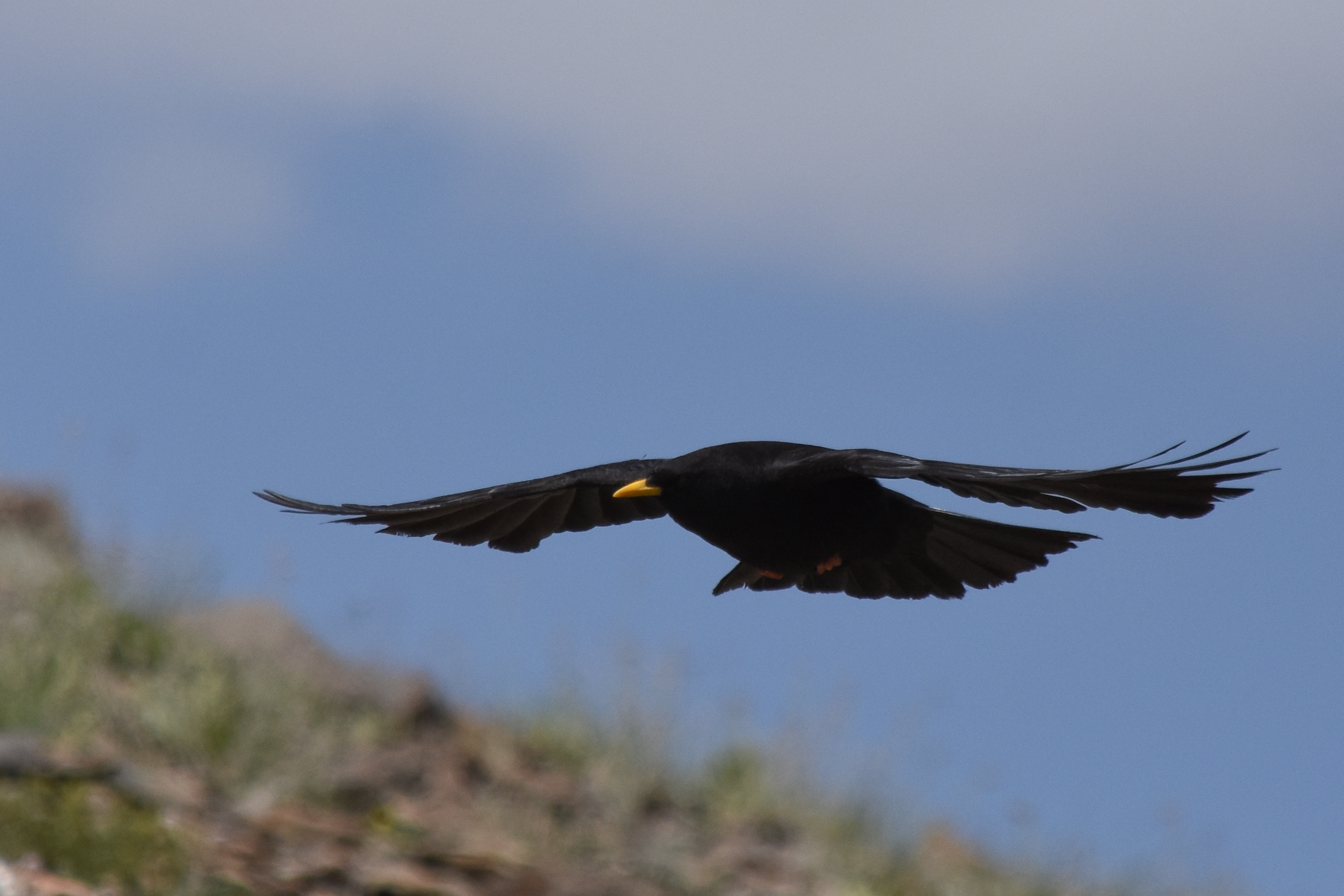
Yellow-billed chough

Because of the park's high altitude and extreme temperatures, the vegetation density is sparse, consisting mostly of alpine trees and groves of Himalayan cedar (Cedrus deodara). In summer, birds such as the Himalayan snowcock, chukar partridge, snow partridge, finches and choughs flourish in the park.

==== Medicinal plants ====
Some plants within the park's alpine habitats have significant medicinal properties. Twenty-two rare and endangered medicinal plant species, have been discovered in and around Pin Valley National Park, which are distributed over 10 different habitat types. Aconitum rotundifolium, Arnebia euchroma, Ephedra gerardiana, Ferula jaeschkeana and Hyoscyamus niger are threatened but medicinally important plants that occur in the park.

== See also ==
- National parks in Himachal Pradesh
- Mud village, Spiti
- Kibber Wildlife Sanctuary
