= Satluj Valley =

Valley in Kinnaur district, Himachal Pradesh, India

Coordinates: 31.345°N 77.453°E

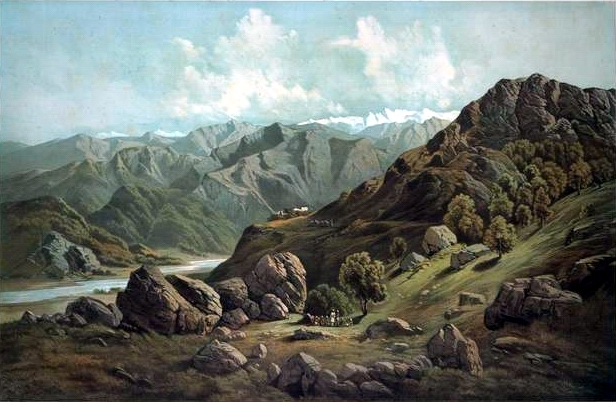
Sutlej Valley from Rampur ca. 1857

Satluj Valley (alternative spelling Sutlej) is a valley in the Kinnaur district of Himachal Pradesh, India. Sutlej river runs through it.
