= Çağdaş =

- Pronunciation: Turkish: [tʃaːdaʃ]
- Gender: Feminine, Masculine
- Language: Turkish

Origin
- Language: Turkish

Çağdaş is a unisex Turkish given name. People named Çağdaş include:

- Çağdaş Atan, Turkish footballer

== See also ==
- Çağdaş, Lice
- Çağdaş Yaşamı Destekleme Derneği, a Turkish non-government organization
- Çankaya Çağdaş Sanatlar Merkezi Concert Hall
