= Serince =

Serince can refer to:

- Serince, Elâzığ
- Serince, Lice
- Serince, Sincik
