= Arıklı =

Arıklı can refer to:

- Arıklı, Ayvacık
- Arıklı, Lice
- Arıklı, Tarsus
