= Dallıca, Lice =

Village in Turkey

Dallıca
- Neighbourhood
- Location in Turkey
- Coordinates: 38°24′11″N 40°47′53″E
- Country: Turkey
- Province: Diyarbakır
- District: Lice
- Population (2022): 641
- Time zone: UTC+3 (TRT)

Dallıca (Kurdish: Cofitnê) is a neighbourhood in the municipality and district of Lice, Diyarbakır Province in Turkey. It is populated by Kurds and had a population of 641 in 2022.

== See also ==
- Bakanlar, Lice
