= Ortac (disambiguation) =

Ortac is an islet in Channel Islands

Ortac may also refer to:

- Ortaç, Lice, neighbourhood in the Lice District of Diyarbakır Province in Turkey
- Serdar Ortaç, Turkish singer, songwriter and composer
- Yusuf Ziya Ortaç, Turkish poet, writer, and politician
