= Gürbeyli, Lice =

Village in Turkey

Gürbeyli
- Neighbourhood
- Location in Turkey
- Coordinates: 38°27′N 40°43′E
- Country: Turkey
- Province: Diyarbakır
- District: Lice
- Population (2022): 128
- Time zone: UTC+3 (TRT)

Gürbeyli (Kurdish: Şêxan) is a neighbourhood in the municipality and district of Lice, Diyarbakır Province in Turkey. It is populated by Kurds and had a population of 128 in 2022.
