= 1975 North Atlantic earthquake =

- Location within North Atlantic
- UTC time: 1975-05-26 09:11:51
- ISC event: 729431
- USGS-ANSS: ComCat
- Local date: May 26, 1975
- Local time: 10:11:51
- Magnitude: 7.9 M_{w} 8.1 M_{s}
- Depth: 33 km (21 mi)
- Epicenter: 35.97°N 17.65°W
- Type: Strike-slip
- Total damage: Limited
- Max. intensity: MMI VI (Strong)
- Tsunami: 2.1 m (6.9 ft)

The 1975 North Atlantic earthquake occurred on May 26 at 09:11 UTC. The epicenter was located in the North Atlantic, in an area between the Azores, Iberian Peninsula, and Morocco. It had a magnitude of M_{w} 7.9, or M_{s} 8.1.

This was an intraplate earthquake that was located about 200 km south of the Gloria Fault, the presumed boundary between the African and the Eurasian plates. It had a right-lateral strike-slip focal mechanism and was unusually large for an oceanic strike-slip event. Damage was reported in Madeira, which is about 250 km away. A tsunami of 0.3 m in maximum water elevation was recorded in Lagos, Portugal and an eyewitness reported a 2 m (6 ft 7 in) wave height at Ponta Delgada in the Azores.

== See also ==
- List of earthquakes in 1975
