= List of earthquakes in 1975 =

Earthquakes in 1975
Approximate epicenters of notable earthquakes in 1975
- 4.0–5.9 magnitude
- 6.0–6.9 magnitude
- 7.0–7.9 magnitude
- 8.0+ magnitude
- Strongest: 7.9 M_{w} 2 events
- Deadliest: Turkey, Diyarbakir Province (Magnitude 6.7) September 6 2,311 deaths
- Total fatalities: 4,379

Number by magnitude
- 9.0+: 0
- 8.0–8.9: 0
- 7.0–7.9: 13
- 6.0–6.9: 57
- 5.0–5.9: 1,444
- 4.0–4.9: 2,591

This is a list of earthquakes in 1975. Only earthquakes of magnitude 6 or above are included, unless they result in damage and/or casualties, or are notable for some other reason. All dates are listed according to UTC time. Maximum intensities are indicated on the Mercalli intensity scale and are sourced from United States Geological Survey (USGS) ShakeMap data. The year was characterized by several large events which helped bring the number of magnitude 7.0+ events to 13. Six events were larger than the biggest event of 1974. Two events reached magnitude 7.9. Turkey had the deadliest event with 2,300 lives being lost in September. China had an earthquake in February which resulted in 2,000 deaths.

== By death toll ==
Rank	Death toll	Magnitude	Location	MMI	Depth (km)	Date
1	2,311	6.7	Turkey, Diyarbakir Province	IX (Violent)	26.0	September 6
2	2,000	7.0	China, Liaoning Province	X (Extreme)	33.0	February 4
3	47	6.8	India, Himachal Pradesh	VIII (Severe)	33.0	January 19

Listed are earthquakes with at least 10 dead.

== By magnitude ==
Rank	Magnitude	Death toll	Location	MMI	Depth (km)	Date
= 1	7.9	0	north Atlantic Ocean	IV (Light)	33.0	May 26
= 1	7.9	0	Papua New Guinea, off the west coast of Bougainville Island	VIII (Severe)	49.0	July 20
= 2	7.8	0	Tonga, south of	( )	9.0	October 11
= 2	7.8	0	Western Samoa	( )	33.0	December 26
= 3	7.7	0	Chile, Bio-Bio Region	IX (Violent)	6.0	May 10
= 3	7.7	0	United Kingdom, British Solomon Islands	VIII (Severe)	44.0	July 20
= 3	7.7	2	United States, Hawaii (island)	IX (Violent)	9.0	November 29
4	7.6	0	United States, Near Islands, Alaska	VI (Strong)	10.0	February 2
5	7.2	1	Philippines, east of Samar	VII (Very strong)	50.0	October 31
= 6	7.0	2,000	China, Liaoning Province	X (Extreme)	33.0	February 4
= 6	7.0	0	Soviet Union, Kuril Islands, Russia	( )	15.0	June 10
= 6	7.0	0	Indonesia, off the west coast of southern Sumatra	VII (Very strong)	33.0	October 1
= 6	7.0	0	United Kingdom, Santa Cruz Islands, British Solomon Islands	( )	54.0	October 6

Listed are earthquakes with at least 7.0 magnitude.

== By month ==
=== January ===
January
- Strongest: 6.8 M_{w} India
- Deadliest: 6.8 M_{w} India; 47 deaths
- Total fatalities: 47

Number by magnitude
- 8.0–8.9: 0
- 7.0–7.9: 0
- 6.0–6.9: 6
- 5.0–5.9: 94
- 4.0–4.9: 235

Date	Country and location	M_{w}	Depth (km)	MMI	Notes	Casualties	
Date	Country and location	M_{w}	Depth (km)	MMI	Notes	Dead	Injured
8	Indonesia, southern Sumatra	6.0	95.0	V			
9	Soviet Union, Dagestan, Russia	5.2	31.0		Some damage was caused in the area.		
14	Indonesia, Banda Sea	6.5	33.0	V			
15	China, western Sichuan Province	6.0	33.0	VI			
19	India, Himachal Pradesh	6.8	33.0	VIII	The 1975 Kinnaur earthquake resulted in 47 deaths and some damage.	47	
19	India, Himachal Pradesh	6.0	33.0	V	Aftershock.		
23	Japan, Kumamoto Prefecture, Kyushu	5.8	10.0	VII	Some damage was reported.		
25	Colombia, Choco Department	6.5	36.0	VII			

=== February ===
February
- Strongest: 7.6 M_{w} United States
- Deadliest: 7.0 M_{w} China; 2,000 deaths
- Total fatalities: 2,001

Number by magnitude
- 8.0–8.9: 0
- 7.0–7.9: 2
- 6.0–6.9: 1
- 5.0–5.9: 95
- 4.0–4.9: 205

Date	Country and location	M_{w}	Depth (km)	MMI	Notes	Casualties	
Date	Country and location	M_{w}	Depth (km)	MMI	Notes	Dead	Injured
2	United States, Near Islands, Alaska	7.6	10.0	IX	The 1975 Near Islands earthquake resulted in some damage.		
4	China, Liaoning Province	7.0	33.0	X	The 1975 Haicheng earthquake left 2,000 people dead. Extensive property destruction was caused. Due to changes in land elevation and water levels officials ordered the evacuation of the local area. Strange animal behaviour and foreshock activity also led to the decision which saved thousands of lives.	2,000	
9	Indonesia, West Java	5.6	27.0	VIII	1 person died and some damage was caused.	1	
22	United States, Andreanof Islands, Alaska	6.5	48.0	V			

=== March ===
March
- Strongest: 6.9 M_{w} Chile
- Deadliest: 6.1 M_{w} Iran; 7 deaths
- Total fatalities: 9

Number by magnitude
- 8.0–8.9: 0
- 7.0–7.9: 0
- 6.0–6.9: 8
- 5.0–5.9: 102
- 4.0–4.9: 204

Date	Country and location	M_{w}	Depth (km)	MMI	Notes	Casualties	
Date	Country and location	M_{w}	Depth (km)	MMI	Notes	Dead	Injured
5	Indonesia, Ceram Sea	6.6	33.0	VIII			
7	Iran, Hormozgan Province	6.1	27.0	VIII	7 people were killed and 200 were injured. Some damage was caused.	7	200
13	Chile, Coquimbo Region	6.9	4.0	VIII	2 deaths and 25 injuries were reported. Some damage was caused.	2	25
17	Indonesia, Papua (province)	6.0	33.0	VI			
18	Peru, Loreto Region	6.2	98.0	V			
23	Taiwan, east of	6.6	21.0				
27	Turkey, northeast Aegean Sea	6.7	5.0	VII	Some damage was caused.		
28	United States, southern Idaho	6.1	5.0	VIII	1 person was injured and property damage was caused with costs reaching $1 million (1975 rate).		1

=== April ===
April
- Strongest: 6.5 M_{w} Norway
- Deadliest: 6.1 M_{w} Venezuela; 3 deaths
- Total fatalities: 3

Number by magnitude
- 8.0–8.9: 0
- 7.0–7.9: 0
- 6.0–6.9: 6
- 5.0–5.9: 145
- 4.0–4.9: 231

Date	Country and location	M_{w}	Depth (km)	MMI	Notes	Casualties	
Date	Country and location	M_{w}	Depth (km)	MMI	Notes	Dead	Injured
5	Venezuela, Lara (state)	6.1	33.0	VI	3 people were killed and 20 were injured. Property damage costs of $1.2 million (1975 rate) were caused.	3	20
9	Papua New Guinea, New Ireland (island)	6.3	133.0	V			
16	Norway, west of Jan Mayen Island	6.5	13.0				
20	Japan, Oita Prefecture, Kyushu	6.1	7.0	IX	8 people were hurt and major damage was reported.		8
23	Mexico, off the coast of Guerrero	6.2	11.0	VII			
28	China, Xinjiang Province	6.3	33.0	VII			

=== May ===
May
- Strongest: 7.9 M_{w} North Atlantic Ocean
- Total fatalities: 0

Number by magnitude
- 8.0–8.9: 0
- 7.0–7.9: 2
- 6.0–6.9: 2
- 5.0–5.9: 106
- 4.0–4.9: 250

Date	Country and location	M_{w}	Depth (km)	MMI	Notes	Casualties	
Date	Country and location	M_{w}	Depth (km)	MMI	Notes	Dead	Injured
5	China, southern Qinghai Province	6.1	33.0	VII			
10	Chile, Bio-Bio Region	7.7	6.0	IX	Some damage was reported.		
26	North Atlantic Ocean	7.9	33.0	IV	Largest event of 1975. The 1975 North Atlantic earthquake caused some damage.		
27	Indonesia, Gorontalo, Sulawesi	6.1	70.0	V			

=== June ===
June
- Strongest: 7.0 M_{w} Soviet Union
- Total fatalities: 0

Number by magnitude
- 8.0–8.9: 0
- 7.0–7.9: 1
- 6.0–6.9: 6
- 5.0–5.9: 191
- 4.0–4.9: 333

Date	Country and location	M_{w}	Depth (km)	MMI	Notes	Casualties	
Date	Country and location	M_{w}	Depth (km)	MMI	Notes	Dead	Injured
10	Soviet Union, Kuril Islands, Russia	7.0	15.0	V			
13	Soviet Union, Kuril Islands, Russia	6.4	19.0		Aftershock.		
14	Soviet Union, Kuril Islands, Russia	6.0	31.0		Aftershock.		
15	Soviet Union, Kuril Islands, Russia	6.2	38.0		Aftershock.		
16	Papua New Guinea, Bismarck Sea	6.5	33.0				
22	Soviet Union, Kuril Islands, Russia	6.1	21.0		Aftershock of June 10 event.		
23	Papua New Guinea, Admiralty Islands	6.2	33.0	VI			
30	United States, Yellowstone National Park, Wyoming	5.9	7.0	VIII	Minor damage was caused. Some rockslides and landslides were observed as well as other topographical changes.		

=== July ===
July
- Strongest: 7.9 M_{w} Papua New Guinea
- Deadliest: 2 events caused 1 death each.
- Total fatalities: 2

Number by magnitude
- 8.0–8.9: 0
- 7.0–7.9: 2
- 6.0–6.9: 8
- 5.0–5.9: 122
- 4.0–4.9: 211

Date	Country and location	M_{w}	Depth (km)	MMI	Notes	Casualties	
Date	Country and location	M_{w}	Depth (km)	MMI	Notes	Dead	Injured
8	Mexico, Gulf of California	6.5	33.0	VIII			
8	Myanmar, Magway Region	6.5	157.0	V	The 1975 Bagan earthquake resulted in 1 death and 1 injury. Damage costs were $500,000 (1975 rate).	1	1
10	Philippines, off the east coast of Mindanao	6.2	86.0	V			
11	Algeria, Setif Province	4.3	33.0	III	1 person died and 18 were injured. Some damage was caused.	1	18
20	Papua New Guinea, off the west coast of Bougainville Island	7.9	49.0	VIII	Largest event of 1975. Many homes were destroyed in the area. A tsunami was generated.		
20	United Kingdom, British Solomon Islands	7.7	44.0	VIII	Aftershock of previous event.		
20	Papua New Guinea, off the west coast of Bougainville Island	6.7	50.0	VI	Aftershock.		
21	Papua New Guinea, off the west coast of Bougainville Island	6.8	47.0	VI	Aftershock.		
21	Papua New Guinea, off the west coast of Bougainville Island	6.1	95.0	V	Aftershock.		
22	British Solomon Islands	6.1	36.0	V	Aftershock.		
30	Indonesia, West Timor	6.1	16.0	VIII			

=== August ===
August
- Strongest: 6.6 M_{w} Soviet Union
- Total fatalities: 0

Number by magnitude
- 8.0–8.9: 0
- 7.0–7.9: 0
- 6.0–6.9: 3
- 5.0–5.9: 116
- 4.0–4.9: 190

Date	Country and location	M_{w}	Depth (km)	MMI	Notes	Casualties	
Date	Country and location	M_{w}	Depth (km)	MMI	Notes	Dead	Injured
1	United States, northern California	5.7	5.0	VIII	10 people were injured. Damage costs were $3 million (1975 rate).		10
10	Argentina, Jujuy Province	6.2	166.0				
15	Soviet Union, Commander Islands, Russia	6.6	4.0				
23	Philippines, northeast of Mindanao	6.0	40.0	VI			

=== September ===
September
- Strongest: 6.7 M_{w} Turkey
- Deadliest: 6.7 M_{w} Turkey; 2,311 deaths
- Total fatalities: 2,313

Number by magnitude
- 8.0–8.9: 0
- 7.0–7.9: 0
- 6.0–6.9: 3
- 5.0–5.9: 110
- 4.0–4.9: 164

Date	Country and location	M_{w}	Depth (km)	MMI	Notes	Casualties	
Date	Country and location	M_{w}	Depth (km)	MMI	Notes	Dead	Injured
6	Turkey, Diyarbakir Province	6.7	26.0	IX	Deadliest event of 1975. The 1975 Lice earthquake resulted in 2,311 deaths. Another 3,372 were injured. Damage costs were $17 million (1975 rate).	2,311	3,372
21	Iran, Chaharmahal and Bakhtiari Province	5.2	33.0	VII	2 people were killed and extensive damage was caused.	2	
24	Tonga	6.5	33.0				
30	Indonesia, off the west coast of southern Sumatra	6.0	33.0	V	Foreshock.		

=== October ===
October
- Strongest: 7.8 M_{w} Tonga
- Deadliest: 7.2 M_{w} Philippines; 1 death
- Total fatalities: 1

Number by magnitude
- 8.0–8.9: 0
- 7.0–7.9: 4
- 6.0–6.9: 9
- 5.0–5.9: 109
- 4.0–4.9: 167

Date	Country and location	M_{w}	Depth (km)	MMI	Notes	Casualties	
Date	Country and location	M_{w}	Depth (km)	MMI	Notes	Dead	Injured
1	Indonesia, off the west coast of southern Sumatra	7.0	33.0	VII			
3	Afghanistan, Kandahar Province	6.7	11.0	VIII			
3	Australia, Western Australia	6.0	33.0				
3	Afghanistan, Kandahar Province	6.4	33.0	VIII	Aftershock.		
6	United Kingdom, Santa Cruz Islands, Solomon Islands	7.0	54.0	VI			
10	New Hebrides, Vanuatu	6.0	123.0	IV			
11	Tonga, south of	7.8	9.0				
20	Fiji	6.5	33.0				
21	Philippines, west of Panay	6.1	33.0	VI	Foreshock.		
21	Philippines, west of Panay	6.3	33.0	VII			
26	Philippines, east of Mindanao	6.1	50.0	IV			
28	Chile, offshore Antofagasta Region	6.3	38.0	VI			
31	Philippines, east of Samar	7.2	50.0	VII	1 person was killed by the earthquake. A tsunami struck causing the destruction of 30 homes.	1	

=== November ===
November
- Strongest: 7.7 M_{w} United States
- Deadliest: 7.7 M_{w} United States; 2 deaths
- Total fatalities: 2

Number by magnitude
- 8.0–8.9: 0
- 7.0–7.9: 1
- 6.0–6.9: 3
- 5.0–5.9: 133
- 4.0–4.9: 190

Date	Country and location	M_{w}	Depth (km)	MMI	Notes	Casualties	
Date	Country and location	M_{w}	Depth (km)	MMI	Notes	Dead	Injured
1	United States, north of Guam	6.1	113.0	VII	Some damage was caused.		
6	Philippines, east of Samar	6.1	11.0		Aftershock of October 31 event.		
15	Philippines, east of Samar	6.1	11.0		Aftershock of October 31 event.		
29	United States, Hawaii (island)	7.7	8.6	IX	The 1975 Hawaii earthquake triggered a local tsunami with 2 deaths being reported. 19 people were injured. Total property damages were $4 million (1975 rate). This was the largest event in Hawaii since 1868.	2	19

=== December ===
December
- Strongest: 7.8 M_{w} Western Samoa
- Deadliest: 5.5 M_{w} Greece; 1 death
- Total fatalities: 1

Number by magnitude
- 8.0–8.9: 0
- 7.0–7.9: 1
- 6.0–6.9: 3
- 5.0–5.9: 121
- 4.0–4.9: 211

Date	Country and location	M_{w}	Depth (km)	MMI	Notes	Casualties	
Date	Country and location	M_{w}	Depth (km)	MMI	Notes	Dead	Injured
11	Peru, Junin Region	6.0	98.0	IV			
17	Indonesia, northern Sumatra	6.2	17.0	VII			
25	Papua New Guinea, East Sepik Province	6.6	115.0	V			
26	Western Samoa	7.8	33.0	IV			
31	Greece, Western Greece	5.5	19.0	VII	1 person was killed, 10 were injured and major damage was caused.	1	10
