= Abalı, Lice =

Village in Turkey

Abalı
- Neighbourhood
- Location in Turkey
- Coordinates: 38.5159°N 40.5604°E
- Country: Turkey
- Province: Diyarbakır
- District: Lice
- Population (2022): 160
- Time zone: UTC+3 (TRT)

Abalı (Kurdish: Korxa) is a neighbourhood in the municipality and district of Lice, Diyarbakır Province in Turkey. It is populated by Kurds and had a population of 160 in 2022.
