= Dolunay, Lice =

Village in Turkey

Dolunay
- Neighbourhood
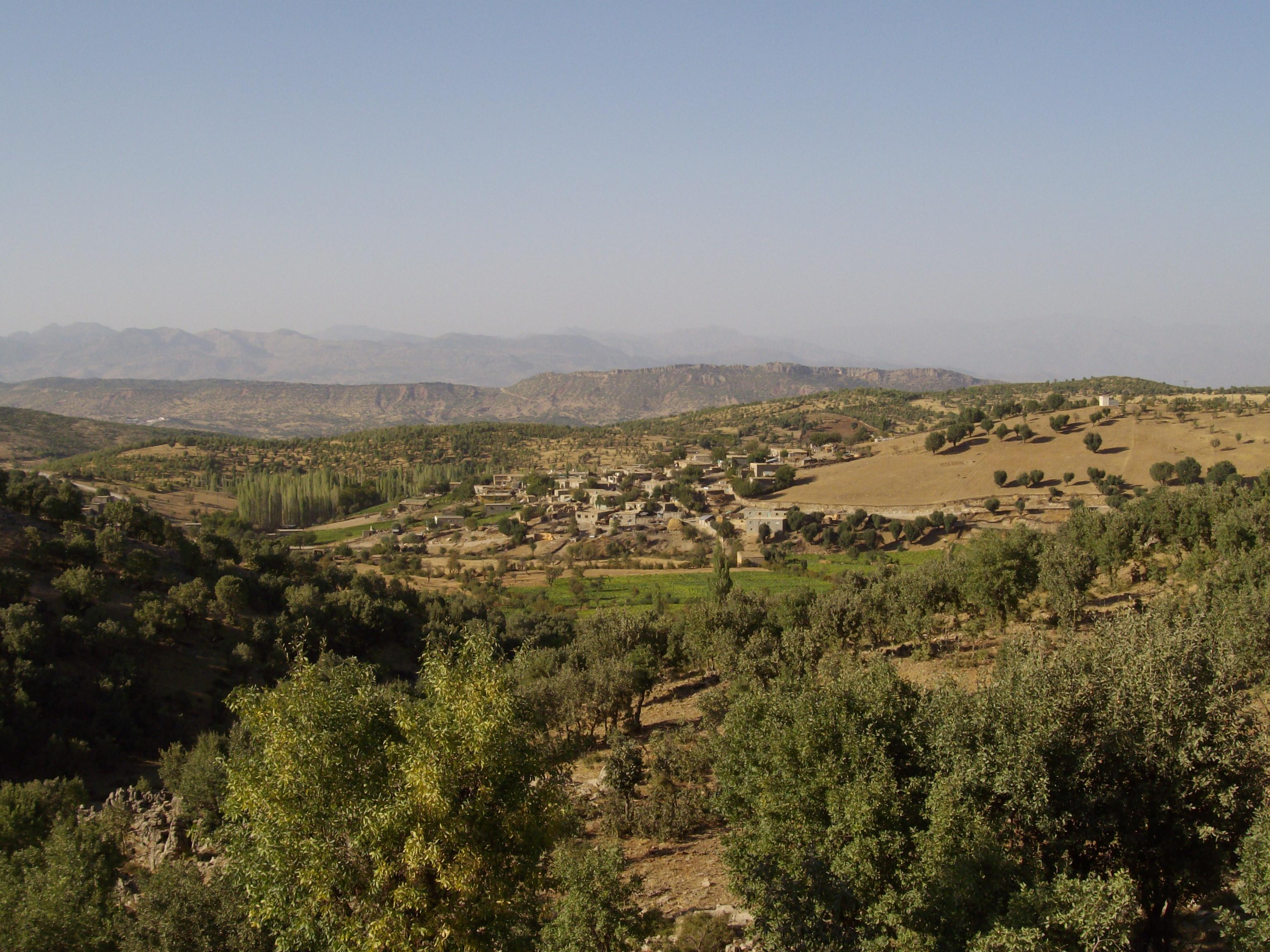

- Location within Turkey
- Country: Turkey
- Province: Diyarbakır
- District: Lice
- Population (2022): 402
- Time zone: UTC+3 (TRT)

Dolunay (Kurdish: Zengê) is a neighbourhood in the municipality and district of Lice, Diyarbakır Province in Turkey. It is populated by Kurds and had a population of 402 in 2022.
