= Yalımlı, Lice =

Village in Turkey

Yalımlı
- Neighbourhood
- Location in Turkey
- Coordinates: 38°35′17″N 40°40′41″E
- Country: Turkey
- Province: Diyarbakır
- District: Lice
- Population (2022): 24
- Time zone: UTC+3 (TRT)

Yalımlı (Kurdish: Xosor) is a neighbourhood in the municipality and district of Lice, Diyarbakır Province in Turkey. It is populated by Kurds and had a population of 24 in 2022.
