= Budak, Lice =

Village in Turkey

Budak
- Neighbourhood
- Location in Turkey
- Coordinates: 38.4047°N 40.7535°E
- Country: Turkey
- Province: Diyarbakır
- District: Lice
- Population (2022): 296
- Time zone: UTC+3 (TRT)

Budak (Kurdish: Hazmaz) is a neighbourhood in the municipality and district of Lice, Diyarbakır Province in Turkey. It is populated by Kurds and had a population of 296 in 2022.
