= Kılıçlı, Lice =

Village in Turkey

Kılıçlı
- Neighbourhood
- Location in Turkey
- Coordinates: 38°32′49″N 40°42′42″E
- Country: Turkey
- Province: Diyarbakır
- District: Lice
- Population (2022): 232
- Time zone: UTC+3 (TRT)

Kılıçlı (Kurdish: Mizag) is a neighbourhood in the municipality and district of Lice, Diyarbakır Province in Turkey. It is populated by Kurds and had a population of 232 in 2022.
