= Çıralı, Lice =

Village in Turkey

Çıralı
- Neighbourhood
- Location in Turkey
- Coordinates: 38°26′01″N 40°47′50″E
- Country: Turkey
- Province: Diyarbakır
- District: Lice
- Population (2022): 201
- Time zone: UTC+3 (TRT)

Çıralı (Kurdish: Herag) is a neighbourhood in the municipality and district of Lice, Diyarbakır Province in Turkey. It is populated by Kurds and had a population of 201 in 2022.
