= Bayırlı, Lice =

Village in Turkey

Bayırlı
- Neighbourhood
- Location in Turkey
- Coordinates: 38.5191°N 40.6346°E
- Country: Turkey
- Province: Diyarbakır
- District: Lice
- Population (2022): 121
- Time zone: UTC+3 (TRT)

Bayırlı (Kurdish: Qarincak) is a neighbourhood in the municipality and district of Lice, Diyarbakır Province in Turkey. It is populated by Kurds and had a population of 121 in 2022.
