= Gökçe, Lice =

Village in Turkey

Gökçe
- Neighbourhood
- Location in Turkey
- Coordinates: 38.3441°N 40.5226°E
- Country: Turkey
- Province: Diyarbakır
- District: Lice
- Population (2022): 241
- Time zone: UTC+3 (TRT)

Gökçe (Kurdish: Zara) is a neighbourhood in the municipality and district of Lice, Diyarbakır Province in Turkey. It is populated by Kurds and had a population of 241 in 2022.

The village is populated by the Zirkan tribe.

== History ==
The village supported the Sheikh Said rebellion in 1925 and was targeted by the authorities who killed the inhabitants and destroyed the village.
