= Bakanlar, Lice =

Village in Turkey

Bakanlar
- Settlement
- Location in Turkey
- Coordinates: 38.40014°N 40.8343°E
- Country: Turkey
- Province: Diyarbakır
- District: Lice
- Time zone: UTC+3 (TRT)

Bakanlar (Kurdish: Helbeqnê) (Note: Also known as Harbakni, Harbekni, or Harbekne.) is a settlement in the municipality and district of Lice, Diyarbakır Province in Turkey. It is populated by Kurds.

== History ==
Harbakni (today called Bakanlar) was historically inhabited by Syriac Orthodox Christians. It was located in the Lice kaza in the Diyarbakır sanjak in the Diyarbekir vilayet in c. 1900. It was populated by 100 Syriacs in 1914, according to the list presented to the Paris Peace Conference by the Assyro-Chaldean delegation.

== Bibliography ==
- Gaunt, David (2006). Massacres, Resistance, Protectors: Muslim-Christian Relations in Eastern Anatolia during World War I. Gorgias Press.
- Jongerden, Joost; Verheij, Jelle, eds. (2012). Social Relations in Ottoman Diyarbekir, 1870-1915. Brill.
- Tîgrîs, Amed; Çakar, Yıldız (2012). Amed : erdnîgarî, dîrok, çand (in Kurdish).
