= Kumluca, Lice =

Village in Turkey

Kumluca
- Neighbourhood
- Location in Turkey
- Coordinates: 38°27′42″N 40°39′53″E
- Country: Turkey
- Province: Diyarbakır
- District: Lice
- Population (2022): 205
- Time zone: UTC+3 (TRT)

Kumluca (Kurdish: Fûm; Syriac: Fūm) (Note: Alternatively transliterated as Foum, Fum, Opum, or Op’oum.) is a neighbourhood in the municipality and district of Lice, Diyarbakır Province in Turkey. It is populated by Kurds and had a population of 205 in 2022.

== History ==
Fūm (today called Kumluca) was historically inhabited by Syriac Orthodox Christians and Armenians. In the Syriac Orthodox patriarchal register of dues of 1870, it was recorded that the village had seventeen households, who paid fifty dues, and there was a church of Morī Qūryāqūs, but it did not have a priest. There were ninety Armenian hearths in 1880. There was an Armenian church of Surb Kirakos. In 1914, it was populated by 700 Syriacs, according to the list presented to the Paris Peace Conference by the Assyro-Chaldean delegation. Amidst the Sayfo, the village was plundered and its population was massacred before mid-July 1915 by gangs of çetes.

== Bibliography ==
- Bcheiry, Iskandar (2009). The Syriac Orthodox Patriarchal Register of Dues of 1870: An Unpublished Historical Document from the Late Ottoman Period. Gorgias Press.
- Gaunt, David (2006). Massacres, Resistance, Protectors: Muslim-Christian Relations in Eastern Anatolia during World War I. Gorgias Press.
- Jongerden, Joost; Verheij, Jelle, eds. (2012). Social Relations in Ottoman Diyarbekir, 1870-1915. Brill.
- Kévorkian, Raymond H. (2006). "Demographic Changes in the Armenian Population of Diarbekir, 1895-1914". In Richard G. Hovannisian (ed.). Armenian Tigranakert/Diarbekir and Edessa/Urfa. Mazda Publishers.
