= Çavundur, Lice =

Village in Turkey

Çavundur
- Neighbourhood
- Location in Turkey
- Coordinates: 38.3246°N 40.6658°E
- Country: Turkey
- Province: Diyarbakır
- District: Lice
- Population (2022): 117
- Time zone: UTC+3 (TRT)

Çavundur (Kurdish: Licok) is a neighbourhood in the municipality and district of Lice, Diyarbakır Province in Turkey. It is populated by Kurds and had a population of 117 in 2022.
