= Ziyaret, Lice =

Village in Turkey

Ziyaret
- Neighbourhood
- Location in Turkey
- Coordinates: 38°19′59″N 40°33′47″E
- Country: Turkey
- Province: Diyarbakır
- District: Lice
- Population (2022): 298
- Time zone: UTC+3 (TRT)

Ziyaret (Kurdish: Fîs) is a neighbourhood in the municipality and district of Lice, Turkey. It is populated by Kurds and had a population of 298 in 2022. The Kurdistan Workers' Party was founded in this village on 27 November 1978.
