= 1975 Kinnaur earthquake =

Earthquake in Himachal Pradesh, India

- Location within India
- UTC time: 1975-01-19 08:02:02
- ISC event: 733389
- USGS-ANSS: ComCat
- Local date: 19 January 1975
- Local time: 13:32:02
- Magnitude: 6.8 M_{s}
- Depth: 33 km (21 mi)
- Epicenter: 32.46°N 78.43°E
- Type: Normal
- Areas affected: India, Himachal Pradesh
- Max. intensity: MMI IX (Violent)
- Casualties: 47

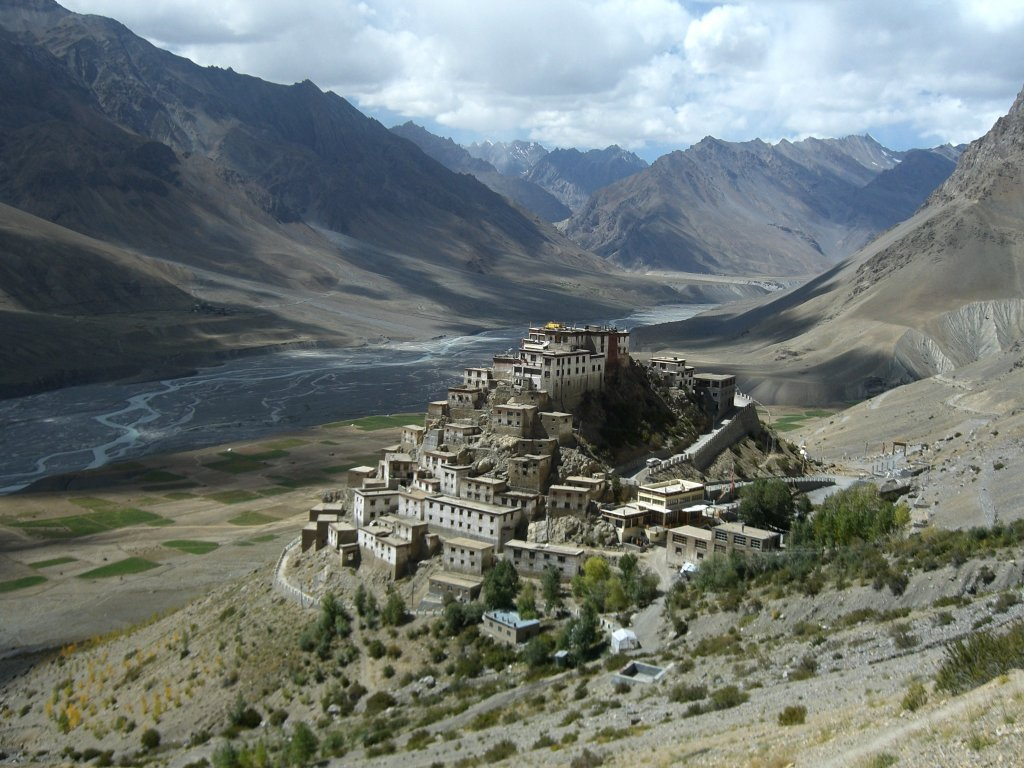
Key Monastery and the Spiti Valley, seriously affected by the Kinnaur earthquake

An earthquake occurred in Kinnaur district in Himachal Pradesh, northern India, in the early afternoon (local time) (08:02 UTC) of 19 January 1975. It had a magnitude of 6.8 on the surface-wave magnitude scale and a maximum perceived intensity of IX (Violent) on the Mercalli intensity scale, causing extensive damage. It caused 47 casualties. Landslides, rock falls and avalanches caused major damage to the Hindustan-Tibet Road. The earthquake affected many monasteries and buildings in the state and led to an extensive restoration work in the late 1970s and early 1980s in Himachal Pradesh. The Spiti and Parachu valleys in particular suffered the greatest damage being on the north–south Kaurik-Chango fault, causing damage to landmarks such as Key Monastery and Tabo Monastery.

== Tectonic setting ==
The state of Himachal Pradesh lies towards the southern boundary of the Himalayan mountain belt, which was formed by the collision between the Indian plate and the Eurasian plate. The mountain building that formed the Himalayas is an example of thrust tectonics and is dominated by thrust faulting. There is however, a significant amount of extension along the length of the mountain belt, possibly related to its arcuate form, with the extension accommodating the bulging out of the frontal part of the Himalayas. However, the faulting in the NW Himalayas demonstrates west–east extension, which is at a fairly high angle to the trend of the main thrust structures and may be better explained as partly accommodating the eastward spreading of the Tibetan Plateau. One of the most significant extensional structures in Himachal Pradesh is the Kaurik-Chango Fault Zone. This is interpreted to be seismically active from the presence of thermal springs and gypsum deposits and from studies of soft-sediment deformation structures thought to be seismites. These seismites have been used to suggest eight earlier earthquakes of magnitude greater than 6 in the Sumdo area affecting these Late Pleistocene to Holocene sediments. The estimated recurrence interval for earthquakes along this fault zone is about 10,000 years.

== Earthquake ==
The earthquake rupture is estimated to be about 25 kilometres (16 mi) in length and 575 square kilometres (222 sq mi) in area, with a displacement of about 0.6 metres (2 ft 0 in). The mainshock was preceded by a major foreshock. Ground rupture was observed in the form of a series of small vertical faults, with downthrow to the west, offsetting part of National Highway 22 between Sumdo and Kaurik, with displacements up to 50 cm.

The isoseismal lines for the earthquake are elongated in a north–south direction, parallel to the strike of the Kaurik-Chango Fault Zone. The focal mechanism of the earthquake indicates normal faulting along with a north–south-trending, west-dipping fault.

== Damage ==
The areas most strongly affected by the earthquake were the districts of Kinnaur and Lahaul-Spiti. The worst-affected villages were in the Parachu and Spiti river valleys. The village of Karauk showed the greatest degree of damage, with no building being unaffected. Buildings sited on slopes or at the base of slopes were not only affected by the shaking but by boulders falling from the hills above them. The performance of the different types of residential buildings varied greatly. Houses made from mud, either directly or as sun-dried bricks showed damage over a wide area (up to 100 kilometres (62 mi) from the epicentre) and those in the epicentral area were often severely damaged. Unreinforced masonry structures were also badly affected, particularly those made of "random rubble stone masonry" (RRSM) with mud mortar, some of them have collapsed completely. The best performing buildings were barrack type houses constructed from corrugated iron covering a timber frame, which generally showed little or no damage.

The many monasteries and temples in the area were mostly badly damaged. They were often constructed with mudbrick or RRSM walls and had heavy roofs. Strong vertical motion during the earthquake led to excessive loads on the upper part of the supporting walls causing them to bulge outwards.

There were many landslides, rockfalls and avalanches triggered by the earthquake. One landslide dammed the Parachu river to a height of 60 metres (200 ft), forming a lake that caused flash flooding when it burst two months later.

== Aftermath ==
Damaged temples and monasteries were repaired or rebuilt immediately after the earthquake. The Guru Ghantal monastery at Tupchiling, which was completely destroyed in the earthquake, was rebuilt using stone masonry and cement mortar. The roof, which was originally wooden, although it had already been replaced by slates by 1975, now consists of corrugated iron sheets. The original design of these earthen buildings had already evolved to contain elements of earthquake resistance before the damage in 1975. The walls were reinforced using ring beams around the whole structure to prevent outward displacement during an earthquake. Further reinforcement was in some cases provided by buttresses of stone or brick at each corner of the building. Initial repairs after the earthquake by the local people involved additional corner buttresses, replacement wooden roofs and repair of the upper walls with stone masonry. Most of these repairs, however, have either caused further problems or may do so in the future.

== See also ==
- List of earthquakes in 1975
- List of earthquakes in India
