= Baharlar, Lice =

Village in Turkey

Baharlar
- Neighbourhood
- Location in Turkey
- Coordinates: 38.5143°N 40.7388°E
- Country: Turkey
- Province: Diyarbakır
- District: Lice
- Population (2022): 174
- Time zone: UTC+3 (TRT)

Baharlar (Kurdish: Barav) is a neighbourhood in the municipality and district of Lice, Diyarbakır Province in Turkey. It is populated by Kurds and had a population of 174 in 2022.
