= 1975 Haicheng earthquake =

Earthquake in Haicheng, Liaoning, China

- Location within China
- UTC time: 1975-02-04 11:36:06
- ISC event: 731961
- USGS-ANSS: ComCat
- Local date: February 4, 1975
- Local time: 19:36 CST
- Magnitude: 7.0 M_{w} 7.5 M_{s} 6.2 mb
- Depth: 15.6 km (9.7 mi)
- Epicenter: 40.66°N 122.68°E
- Areas affected: Northeast China
- Max. intensity: MMI IX (Violent)
- Tsunami: None
- Casualties: 1,328–2,041 killed

On February 4, 1975, at 19:36 CST, an earthquake of M_{s} 7.5 and intensity (MMI) IX hit the city of Haicheng, Liaoning, China. The successful early evacuation ordered by Chinese officials, based mainly on the pronounced foreshock sequence leading up to the earthquake, makes it a notable instance of earthquake prediction. The evacuation remains the only successful evacuation of a potentially affected population before an earthquake in history. The evacuation of the city prevented up to 150,000 deaths according to estimates, however, many died from fire and hypothermia in the subsequent days.

None of the precursors observed in this earthquake were observed in the 1976 Tangshan earthquake, which killed over 240,000 a year later.

== Tectonic setting ==
Leading up to the earthquake in 1975, there were multiple large earthquakes that occurred in three years all due to right-lateral motion of north northeast-trending strike-slip faults, they also appeared to have migrated from southwest to northeast. These were the three earthquakes of M 6.8, 6.7, and 7.2 in the Xingtai area in March 1966, the M 6.7 Hejian earthquake of 1967, and the M 7.4 Bohai Sea earthquake of 1969. These interpretations are believed to be tied into the Geomechanics Theory of Li Siguang. The theory states "that north-northeast China is part of an integral geological system characterized by neotectonic right-lateral motion along north-northeast trending structures", in other terms, this relates to the deformation of the Eurasian plate with an east–west compressive stress regime which was caused by continental collision at the Himalaya and plate subduction along the Japan–Kuril trenches. There is a belief among scientists that the early earthquakes in North China set off the large system and led to more earthquakes later on.

== Earthquake ==
The earthquake struck on 4 February 1975 at 19:36 CST in Liaoning Province. It measured 7.3 on the surface-wave magnitude scale, making it the largest earthquake in northeastern China since records began. The earthquake was caused by rupture on a west–northwest striking strike-slip fault measuring 54 km (34 mi) long. The rupture propagated 38 km (24 mi) in the west–northwest direction and towards the east–southeast for 16 km (9.9 mi). An average slip of 1.17 m (3 ft 10 in) in the horizontal and 0.33 m (1 ft 1 in) in the vertical components were estimated. An intense foreshock sequence preceded the mainshock about 25 hours prior. The foreshock, mainshock, and aftershock sequence produced earthquakes distributed at depths of 12–15 km (7.5–9.3 mi). Aftershocks persisted for decades, most notably in 1999 and 2000 when M_{s}5.4–5.5 earthquakes struck near Xiuyan.

The earthquake was assigned a maximum Modified Mercalli intensity of IX (Violent) in an area 20–30 km (12–19 mi) long, where all homes were destroyed, including in the epicenter region. In Haicheng, the assigned intensity was VIII (Severe); the city was also largely destroyed. Several multi-storey buildings were destroyed or heavily damaged; high chimneys were also broken or twisted. The city of Anshan, 50 km (31 mi) north of the epicenter, was assigned an intensity of VII (Very strong). There was no heavy damage reported in the city although most older chimneys were broken. Some minor damage was also reported in Shenyang, where the it had an intensity of VI (Strong). In Seoul, South Korea, the earthquake was felt IV (Light).

== Impact ==
Much of the city was evacuated before the earthquake, so relatively few died from building collapse, however, many died from fire and hypothermia in the subsequent days. The evacuees lived during the deep winter in self-made tents made of tree branches, bed sheets, tarps and straw, 372 froze to death and 6,578 suffered frostbite, while a fire burned 341 to death and 980 suffered non-fatal burns. The fire was one of the most notable earthquake-induced fires in China, triggered from a combination of cooking, winter heating and lighting.

The earthquake caused a large amount of destruction to infrastructure and property in Haicheng. There was mass building collapse throughout the area as well as the destruction of cultivated land, roads, highways, and railways. It is approximated that 90% of the structures in Haicheng sustained significant damage or were completely destroyed. Local bridges collapsed and oil transport pipelines were damaged. Limited damage was reported as far away as South Korea and Japan. There were a few reports of smaller buildings collapsing partially as well as intense shaking on high rise buildings.

== Earthquake prediction ==
The early evacuation ordered by Chinese officials had been questioned to whether it was a scientific earthquake prediction or a fluke. The Chinese traced their predictions to as early as 1970. A team of scientists from the U.S. visited laboratories in China in 1976 to investigate the Haicheng prediction. Their report concluded that the 1975 Haicheng prediction was based mainly on the pronounced foreshock sequence. Due to these foreshocks, some of the final evacuation orders were given only hours before the destructive earthquake preventing further loss of life. This "prediction" was later put under heavy scrutiny and was deemed as a fluke.

This prediction and evacuation limited the number of deaths to under 2,500 and total injuries to 27,500 people. The estimated number of injured and deceased individuals without the implementation of the evacuation may have been more than 150,000 people could have been injured without a successful evacuation. None of the precursors observed in this earthquake were observed in the 1976 Tangshan earthquake, which killed over 240,000.

After the occurrence of a number of large earthquakes from 1966 to 1969, a meeting was held nationally to discuss where the largest seismic danger was in the People's Republic of China. These large earthquakes were determined to be moving to the North East, and it was also discussed that there would be a large earthquake of magnitude 5–6 at least along the Pohai Gulf. The prominent faults in the area determined to be the danger were the Jinzhou, Zhuanghe, and Yalu River faults, which were all prominent North-Northeast striking faults. There was then a large increase in scientific investigation in the surrounding province of Liaoning, as well as many new seismic stations, due to the long-range prediction.

After four years of data collection the meeting was brought back together to determine a new prediction. They believed that the magnitude 5–6 earthquake they had predicted in 1970 would now occur within the next 2 years in the northern part of the Pohai Gulf. Severely increased microearthquake activity as well as levelling and short level lines data assisted in the new prediction decision. The scientific examinations in the area were increased significantly and a large education campaign was initiated to inform the public on earthquake safety and the hazards of earthquakes.

There was a series of earthquakes in the area of Liaoyang, an area of usually low seismicity, the largest of which had a magnitude of 4.8. These quakes prompted the Revolutionary Committee of the Liaoning Province to issue alerts of a possible large earthquake in the near future. Reports of odd animal behavior and changes in ground water levels increased in the area into 1975.

The prediction was further updated to be a magnitude 5.5–6 earthquake in the first half of 1975, likely due to the series of quakes at the end of 1974 as well as the observations of animals and groundwater. The foreshocks of the Haicheng earthquake then began on February 1, 1975, and continued into February 3. There were foreshocks of magnitudes greater than 4, which were felt throughout the province. The reports of odd behavior of water wells and animals began to migrate towards Haicheng at this time as well. Anomalies of radon emissions, electrical resistivity, and a tilt anomaly also occurred. All of this data led to the conclusion that the earthquake would occur within the next two days. Emergency measures were then taken to prevent loss of life.

== Prediction scrutiny ==
In recent years, the success of the earthquake's prediction has come under scrutiny. Seismologists have agreed that the Haicheng earthquake can't be looked to as any sort of "prototype" for predicting future earthquakes, as the foreshocks that played a huge role in leading to prediction of this earthquake are not a regular, reliable occurrence before all earthquakes. However, Qi-Fu Chen, a research professor at Beijing's China Earthquake Administration, explained that this earthquake at least "showed the importance of public education," prompting a further discussion about the necessity of making the public aware of the dangers, preparations, and warning signs related to earthquakes.

It is still a topic of debate, however, whether there is any merit whatsoever in the prediction. Until recently, there were no details given of the evacuation, which led to many scientists questioning the success of the prediction. The suspicion began were a lack of written records but increased due to the time period being during the cultural revolution, which was a period where gaining accurate information from China was extremely difficult.

This earthquake hit the nearby city of Tangshan and none of the foreshocks or other phenomena which were present before the Haicheng earthquake were observed prior to this incident. This second earthquake showed that the prediction of Haicheng's earthquake and subsequent evacuation was likely a fluke incident.

== See also ==
- List of earthquakes in 1975
- List of earthquakes in China
- Earthquake prediction
