= Daralan, Lice =

Village in Turkey

Daralan
- Neighbourhood
- Location in Turkey
- Coordinates: 38.4468°N 40.5343°E
- Country: Turkey
- Province: Diyarbakır
- District: Lice
- Population (2022): 406
- Time zone: UTC+3 (TRT)

Daralan (Kurdish: Comelaş) is a neighbourhood in the municipality and district of Lice, Diyarbakır Province in Turkey. It is populated by Kurds and had a population of 406 in 2022.
