= Saydamlı, Lice =

Village in Turkey

Saydamlı
- Neighbourhood
- Location in Turkey
- Coordinates: 38°33′N 40°38′E
- Country: Turkey
- Province: Diyarbakır
- District: Lice
- Population (2022): 52
- Time zone: UTC+3 (TRT)

Saydamlı (Kurdish: Şaxûr) is a neighbourhood in the municipality and district of Lice, Diyarbakır Province in Turkey. It is populated by Kurds and had a population of 52 in 2022.
