= Güçlü, Lice =

Village in Turkey

Güçlü
- Neighbourhood
- Location in Turkey
- Coordinates: 38°22′35″N 40°32′56″E
- Country: Turkey
- Province: Diyarbakır
- District: Lice
- Population (2022): 53
- Time zone: UTC+3 (TRT)

Güçlü (Kurdish: Celik) is a neighbourhood in the municipality and district of Lice, Diyarbakır Province in Turkey. It is populated by Kurds and had a population of 53 in 2022.
