= Lice, Turkey =

Town and district of Diyarbakır, Turkey

Lice
- District and municipality
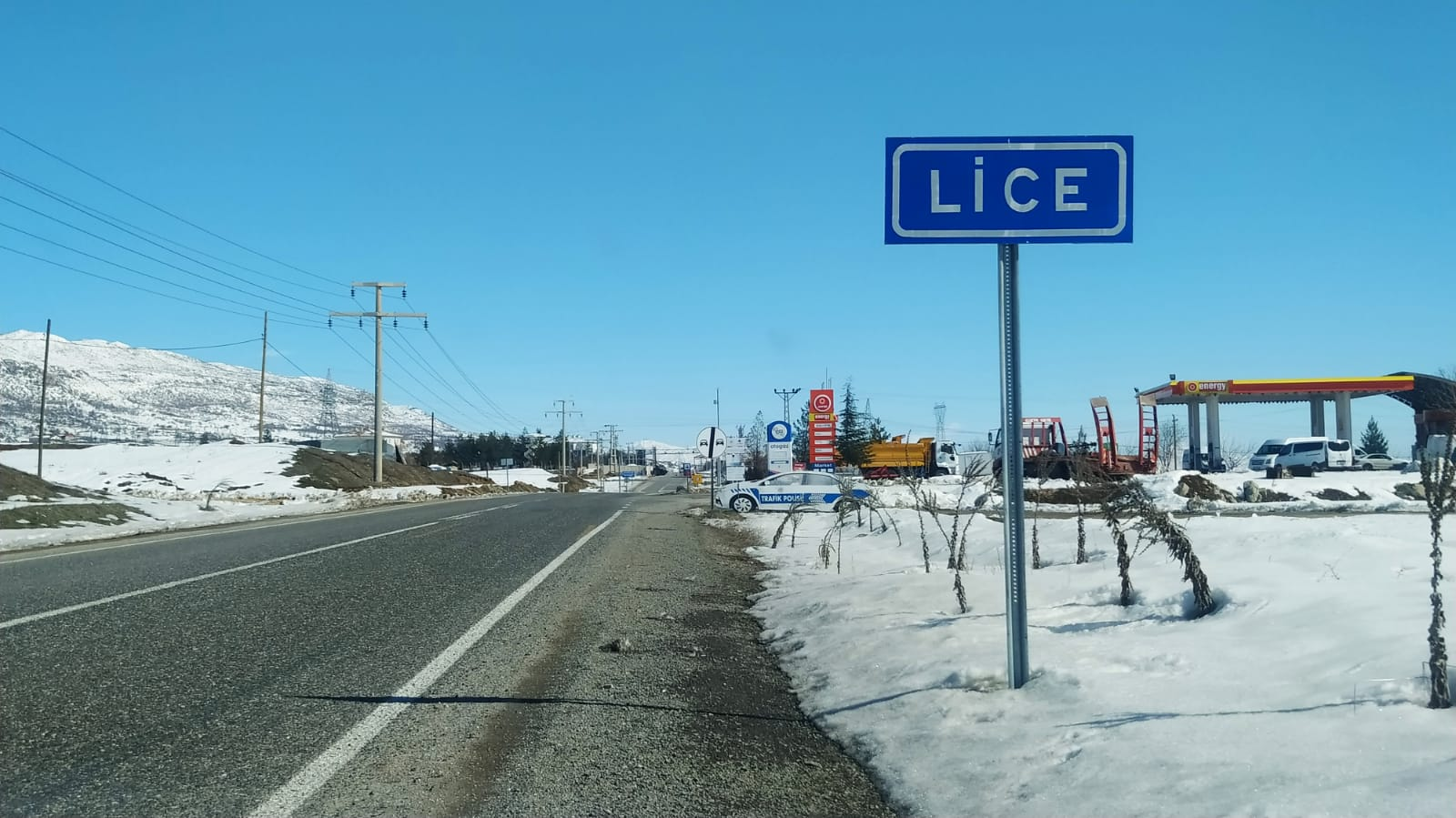
- Lice under the snow

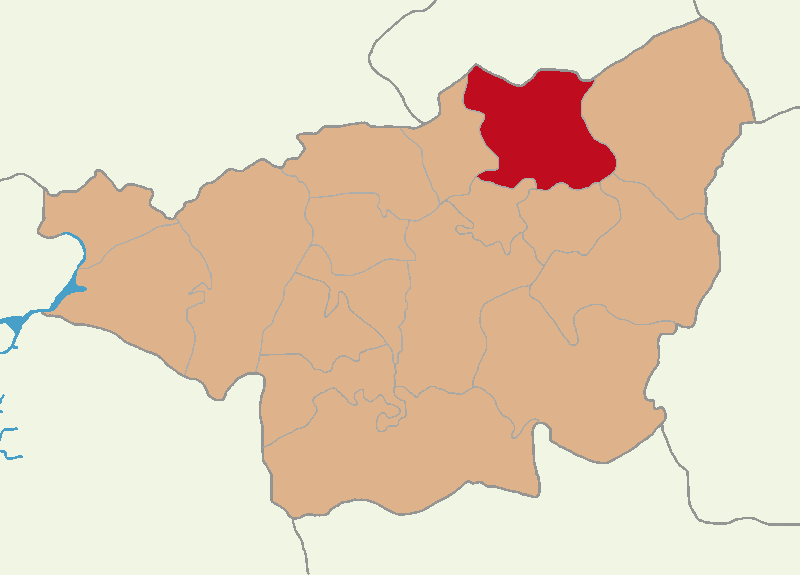
- Map showing Lice District in Diyarbakır Province

- Location within Turkey
- Coordinates: 38°27′0″N 40°39′0″E
- Country: Turkey
- Province: Diyarbakır

Government
  - Mayor: Dilek Diyar Özer (DEM)
- Area: 982 km^{2} (379 sq mi)
- Population (2022): 24,364
  - Density: 24.8/km^{2} (64.3/sq mi)
- Time zone: UTC+3 (TRT)
- Postal code: 21700
- Area code: 0412
- Website: www.lice.bel.tr

Lice (Turkish pronunciation: [ˈlidʒe]; Kurdish: Lîcê; Armenian: Լճէ, romanized: Ldjē; Syriac: ܠܓܗ) is a district and town of Diyarbakır Province, Turkey. Its area is 982 km^{2} and population is 24,364 (2022). It is located 90 km from the capital, Diyarbakır, and the current governor of the town is Kerem Yenigün. The town is populated by Kurds.

The district of Lice traces its roots all the way back to Mesopotamia and ancient Assyria, and its history is significantly diverse across multiple ethnic groups. Although originally having a mixed population of Armenians, Assyrians, and Kurds, its current population is mainly Kurds. Lice's modern history is defined by its role in the Kurdish-Turkish conflict, where in the village of Fîs the Kurdistan Workers' Party (PKK) was founded. This has caused significant tensions between the Turkish government and ethnic Kurds, and Lice has been the site of numerous human rights violations across both sides. The district is also known for its role in drug trafficking and organized crime, with the Baybaşin family originating from Lice.

== History ==
The roots of Lice can be traced back to ancient Assyria with the Tigris tunnel and Birkleyn Caves, which form a source for the Tigris and contain several inscriptions and reliefs of the Assyrian and Neo-Assyrian Empires. A seal of Shalmaneser III can be seen in the caves, marking his reign over the region and attesting the region back to the Hurrians and Mitanni. The district of Lice previously had speakers of Mlaḥsô, an extinct Neo-Aramaic dialect that was traditionally spoken by Assyrians. The dialect was spoken in the villages of Mlaḥsô and ˁAnşa near the district of Lice.

The Kurdish castle of Ataq used to exist near the modern Lice, and was part of one of the Kurdish sanjaks incorporated Diyarbakır. However, in comparison with other regions, tribalism is notably absent from Lice.

During the Armenian genocide, all males were massacred, women and children were deported and their fate is unknown. At the Paris Peace Conference, Syriac Orthodox Patriarch Ignatius Aphrem I of the Assyro-Chaldean delegation estimated that the number of Syriac Orthodox Christians killed in the Lice kaza was 4,706, with 10 villages destroyed. The kaymakam of the district, who refused to take part in the massacres of Christians, was assassinated by Ottoman operatives.

=== 20th century ===
Lice was the headquarters of the 5th Army Corps of the Turkish army during the Sheikh Said rebellion in 1925 and it was a focal point at the beginning of the rebellion. The town was captured on the 20 February by the troops loyal to Sheikh Said. The Kurdish Zirki tribe in the Lice district also supported the Sheik Said rebellion and as a reprisal, the tribes villages Çaylarbaşı, Kurlu, Alataş, Mat-bur and Çağlayan have been demolished and the residing population was killed by troops of the Turkish army. It was reported that the troops of the Turkish Major Ali Haydar had wiped out the majority of the Sheikhs, attacking the tribes that supported the rebellion with cruelty.

On 6 September 1975, Lice was struck by an earthquake with a magnitude of M_{s} 6.7. Around 1,500 people were killed in Lice according to the mayor. The governor of Diyarbakır said nearly 75 percent of the city's buildings were razed while 95 percent of the town was damaged due to inadequate construction. At least 12 neighbourhoods of the district were destroyed while heavy damage occurred in Yenişehir. Across the district, all of its public and government buildings sustained heavy damage or were destroyed. Villages located closer to the epicenter experienced total destruction.

The Kurdistan Workers' Party (PKK) was founded in the village of Fîs, in Lice district on November 27, 1978. The founding congress of the group occurred in the village and was attended by 25 people, with the aims and structural organization decided on. Kurdish groups occasionally visit the house where the conference first took place as a tourist attraction.

The Lice massacre, during which the Turkish army demolished large parts of the town in reprisal of the death of an Jandarma officer, took place from October 20–23, 1993. Before the events of the massacre, tensions between the PKK and the Turkish armed forces were high, with several damages to infrastructure taking place from both sides. Human Rights Watch stated that the massacre was one of the worst human rights violations by the Turkish army in the history of the Kurdish-Turkish conflict.

=== 21st century ===
In 2013, Turkish security forces engaged in clashes with Kurdish villagers in the district, leading to the death of a demonstrator, Medeni Yıldırım. Afterwards, hundreds of Kurds marched in a funeral procession to mourn Yıldırım, and were joined by Turkish public sector workers. The site of the clashes occurred near a military outpost, which was connected to drug operations that took place in the district and the larger Diyarbakır province.

A year later, peace talks between the Government of Turkey and the PKK began in Lice as tensions began to run high in the district. Tensions followed over allegations of certain parties attempting to disrupt the peace process between the Kurds and Turks, as well as disputes over a statue erected of a PKK soldier.

The February 2016 Lice bombing was claimed by Kurdish HPG forces.

In 2018, Amnesty International released a statement condemning the killings of Remzi Güler and his son Mahmut Güler, whose bodies were found in Lice. The PKK claimed responsibility for the attacks.

Between 2018 and 2019 localities in the Lice district have often been targeted with curfews declared by the Turkish authorities, which wanted to execute security operations in the district. Bianet noted that around 350 curfews had been declared in Turkey up to this point, with the highest number being in the Diyarbakır province.

In 2019, the winner for mayoral position in the 2019 Turkish local elections was Tarik Mercan of the Peoples' Equality and Democracy Party (DEM) party. In 2024, following the 2024 Turkish local elections, Dilek Diyar Özer from the DEM was elected to the position of mayor for the Lice district.

== Demographics ==
In 1914, 5,980 Armenians and 4,100 Assyro-Chaldeans lived in the kaza. 658 Syriac Orthodox families lived in the district in 10 villages, while Armenians had 24 churches, one monastery and five schools with 305 students. Lice proper had 12,000 inhabitants, including 7,000 Christians (religiously Armenian Apostolic, Chaldean Catholic and Syriac Orthodox).

Historical population

Year	Pop.	±% p.a.
1927	21,558	—
1935	23,364	+1.01%
1940	26,577	+2.61%
1945	26,512	−0.05%
1950	34,028	+5.12%
1955	37,758	+2.10%
1960	29,770	−4.64%
1965	34,356	+2.91%
1970	38,442	+2.27%
1975	37,673	−0.40%
1980	41,402	+1.91%

Year	Pop.	±% p.a.
1985	47,024	+2.58%
1990	47,088	+0.03%
2000	24,877	−6.18%
2007	30,560	+2.98%
2008	31,251	+2.26%
2009	26,793	−14.27%
2010	26,791	−0.01%
2011	29,098	+8.61%
2012	27,414	−5.79%
2013	26,715	−2.55%
2014	26,427	−1.08%

Year	Pop.	±% p.a.
2015	25,354	−4.06%
2016	25,116	−0.94%
2017	24,412	−2.80%
2018	26,163	+7.17%
2019	25,222	−3.60%
2020	25,027	−0.77%
2021	24,313	−2.85%
2022	24,364	+0.21%
2023	26,168	+7.40%
2024	24,959	−4.62%

Source: 2015-2024 data

== Composition ==
There are 70 neighbourhoods in Lice District:

- Abalı
- Akçabudak
- Arıklı
- Bağlan
- Baharlar
- Bayırlı
- Birlik
- Budak
- Çağdaş
- Cami Kebir
- Çarşı
- Çavundur
- Çeper
- Çıralı
- Dallıca
- Damar
- Daralan
- Delvan
- Dernek
- Dibekköy
- Dolunay
- Duruköy
- Ecemiş
- Erginköy
- Esenler
- Gökçe
- Güçlü
- Güldiken
- Gürbeyli
- Hedik
- Kabakaya
- Kali
- Karahasan
- Kelvan
- Kılıçlı
- Kıpçak
- Kıralan
- Kıyıköy
- Körtük
- Kumluca
- Kutlu
- Mulla
- Müminağa
- Muradiye
- Ortaç
- Örtülü
- Oyuklu
- Şaar
- Savat
- Saydamlı
- Şenlik
- Serince
- Sığınak
- Tepe
- Türeli
- Tuzlaköy
- Uçarlı
- Üçdamlar
- Ulucak
- Yalaza
- Yalımlı
- Yamaçlı
- Yaprakköy
- Yenişehir
- Yeşilburç
- Yolçatı
- Yorulmaz
- Yünlüce
- Ziyaret
- Zümrüt

== Notable people ==
- Ehmedê Xasî, Kurdish poet (1866-1951)
- Tarık Ziya Ekinci, Turkish-Kurdish politician (1925–2024)
- Mehmed Emîn Bozarslan, Turkish-Kurdish writer (born 1935)
- Hikmet Çetin, Turkish politician (born 1937)
- Yusuf Ekinci, Turkish politician (1942-1994)
- Burhan Eşer, footballer (born 1985)
- Gazi Yaşargil, neurosurgeon (1925–2025)
- Hüseyin Baybaşin, Kurdish drug baron (born 1956)
- Behçet Cantürk, Kurdish mob boss (1950–1994)
- Sezgin Tanrıkulu, human rights lawyer (born 1963)
- Halis Toprak (1938–2016), businessman in the construction industry

== See also ==
- 1975 Lice earthquake
- Lice massacre
- Kurdistan Workers' Party
- Kurdistan Workers' Party insurgency
