= Kıpçak, Lice =

Village in Turkey

Kıpçak
- Neighbourhood
- Location in Turkey
- Coordinates: 38°27′12″N 40°47′0″E
- Country: Turkey
- Province: Diyarbakır
- District: Lice
- Population (2022): 490
- Time zone: UTC+3 (TRT)

Kıpçak (Kurdish: Bekiran) is a neighbourhood in the municipality and district of Lice, Diyarbakır Province in Turkey. It is populated by Kurds and had a population of 490 in 2022.
