= Çeper, Lice =

Village in Turkey

Çeper
- Neighbourhood
- Location in Turkey
- Coordinates: 38°28′N 40°33′E
- Country: Turkey
- Province: Diyarbakır
- District: Lice
- Population (2022): 506
- Time zone: UTC+3 (TRT)

Çeper (Kurdish: Kele) is a neighbourhood in the municipality and district of Lice, Diyarbakır Province in Turkey. It is populated by Kurds and had a population of 506 in 2022.
