= Yaprakköy, Lice =

Village in Turkey

Yaprakköy
- Neighbourhood
- Location in Turkey
- Coordinates: 38°28′11″N 40°45′8″E
- Country: Turkey
- Province: Diyarbakır
- District: Lice
- Population (2022): 363
- Time zone: UTC+3 (TRT)

Yaprakköy (Kurdish: Tûtê) is a neighbourhood in the municipality and district of Lice, Diyarbakır Province in Turkey. It is populated by Kurds and had a population of 363 in 2022.
