= Tarık Ziya Ekinci =

Turkish politician (1925–2024)

Member of the Grand National Assembly of Turkey for Diyarbakır
- In office 22 October 1965 – 12 October 1969

Personal details
- Born: 25 February 1925 Lice, Turkey
- Died: 15 August 2024 (aged 99) Istanbul, Turkey
- Party: TİP
- Education: Istanbul University
- Occupation: Author

Tarık Ziya Ekinci (25 February 1925 – 15 August 2024) was a Kurdish politician and physician from Turkey. A member of the Workers' Party of Turkey, he served in the Grand National Assembly from 1965 to 1969. His brother Yusuf Ekinci was assassinated by Turkish deep state in 1994; his murder is still unsolved till this date.

Ekinci died in Istanbul on 15 August 2024, at the age of 99.
