= Hedik, Lice =

Village in Turkey

Hedik
- Neighbourhood
- Location in Turkey
- Coordinates: 38°30′31″N 40°35′25″E
- Country: Turkey
- Province: Diyarbakır
- District: Lice
- Population (2022): 82
- Time zone: UTC+3 (TRT)

Hedik (Kurdish: Hêdig) is a neighbourhood in the municipality and district of Lice, Diyarbakır Province in Turkey. It is populated by Kurds and had a population of 82 in 2022.
