= Üçdamlar, Lice =

Village in Turkey

Üçdamlar
- Neighbourhood
- Location in Turkey
- Coordinates: 38°30′43″N 40°47′17″E
- Country: Turkey
- Province: Diyarbakır
- District: Lice
- Population (2022): 1,299
- Time zone: UTC+3 (TRT)

Üçdamlar (Kurdish: Bawert) is a neighbourhood in the municipality and district of Lice, Diyarbakır Province in Turkey. It is populated by Kurds and had a population of 1,299 in 2022.
