= Esenler, Lice =

Village in Turkey

Esenler
- Neighbourhood
- Location in Turkey
- Coordinates: 38.3216°N 40.5898°E
- Country: Turkey
- Province: Diyarbakır
- District: Lice
- Population (2022): 345
- Time zone: UTC+3 (TRT)

Esenler (Kurdish: Balicnê) is a neighbourhood in the municipality and district of Lice, Diyarbakır Province in Turkey. It is populated by Kurds and had a population of 345 in 2022.
