= Sığınak, Lice =

Village in Turkey

Sığınak
- Neighbourhood
- Location in Turkey
- Coordinates: 38°26′N 40°45′E
- Country: Turkey
- Province: Diyarbakır
- District: Lice
- Population (2022): 135
- Time zone: UTC+3 (TRT)

Sığınak (Kurdish: Banadêran) is a neighbourhood in the municipality and district of Lice, Diyarbakır Province in Turkey. It is populated by Kurds and had a population of 135 in 2022.
