= Ecemiş, Lice =

Village in Turkey

Ecemiş
- Neighbourhood
- Location in Turkey
- Coordinates: 38°36′N 40°27′E
- Country: Turkey
- Province: Diyarbakır
- District: Lice
- Population (2022): 158
- Time zone: UTC+3 (TRT)

Ecemiş (Kurdish: Mala Mihê Biro) is a neighbourhood in the municipality and district of Lice, Diyarbakır Province in Turkey. It is populated by Kurds and had a population of 158 in 2022.
