= Oyuklu, Lice =

Village in Turkey

Oyuklu
- Neighbourhood
- Location within Turkey
- Coordinates: 38°19′34″N 40°46′55″E
- Country: Turkey
- Province: Diyarbakır
- District: Lice
- Population (2022): 1,025
- Time zone: UTC+3 (TRT)

Oyuklu ( Local Arabic: Sınê) is a neighbourhood in the municipality and district of Lice, Diyarbakır Province in Turkey. It is the only settlement in the Diyarbakır province that is populated by Arabs, had a population of 1,025 in 2022.
