= Dernek, Lice =

Village in Turkey

Dernek
- Neighbourhood
- Location in Turkey
- Coordinates: 38.4672°N 40.5884°E
- Country: Turkey
- Province: Diyarbakır
- District: Lice
- Population (2022): 953
- Time zone: UTC+3 (TRT)

Dernek (Kurdish: Tilê) is a neighbourhood in the municipality and district of Lice, Diyarbakır Province in Turkey. It is populated by Kurds and had a population of 953 in 2022.
