= Erginköy, Lice =

Village in Turkey

Erginköy
- Neighbourhood
- Location in Turkey
- Coordinates: 38°29′59″N 40°32′14″E
- Country: Turkey
- Province: Diyarbakır
- District: Lice
- Population (2022): 104
- Time zone: UTC+3 (TRT)

Erginköy (Kurdish: Marik) is a neighbourhood in the municipality and district of Lice, Diyarbakır Province in Turkey. It is populated by Kurds and had a population of 104 in 2022.
