= Kutlu, Lice =

Village in Turkey

Kutlu
- Neighbourhood
- Location in Turkey
- Coordinates: 38°20′55″N 40°47′30″E
- Country: Turkey
- Province: Diyarbakır
- District: Lice
- Population (2022): 347
- Time zone: UTC+3 (TRT)

Kutlu (Kurdish: Bamitnê; Syriac: Bāmitnī) (Note: Also known as Bamatmi, Bamitni, Bemitni, Bamêtni, Palindjné, Yamoutni, Pamot’né, Yamutni, and Palinjne.) is a neighbourhood in the municipality and district of Lice, Diyarbakır Province in Turkey. It is populated by Kurds and had a population of 347 in 2022. The village is populated by the Zirkan tribe.

== History ==
Bāmitnī (today called Kutlu) was historically inhabited by Syriac Orthodox Christians and Kurdish-speaking Armenians. In the Syriac Orthodox patriarchal register of dues of 1870, it was recorded that the village had 10 households, who paid 39 dues, and did not have a church or a priest. There were 10 Armenian hearths in 1880. There was an Armenian church of Surb Khach.

It was located in the kaza (district) of Lice in the Diyarbekir sanjak in the Diyarbekir vilayet in c. 1900. In 1914, it was populated by 100 Syriacs, according to the list presented to the Paris Peace Conference by the Assyro-Chaldean delegation. The Armenian and Syriac population was destroyed in 1915 amidst the Armenian genocide and Sayfo, respectively.

The village supported the Sheikh Said rebellion in 1925 and was targeted by the authorities who killed the inhabitants and destroyed the village.

== Bibliography ==
- Bcheiry, Iskandar (2009). The Syriac Orthodox Patriarchal Register of Dues of 1870: An Unpublished Historical Document from the Late Ottoman Period. Gorgias Press.
- Gaunt, David (2006). Massacres, Resistance, Protectors: Muslim-Christian Relations in Eastern Anatolia during World War I. Gorgias Press.
- Jongerden, Joost; Verheij, Jelle, eds. (2012). Social Relations in Ottoman Diyarbekir, 1870-1915. Brill.
- Kévorkian, Raymond H. (2006). "Demographic Changes in the Armenian Population of Diarbekir, 1895-1914". In Richard G. Hovannisian (ed.). Armenian Tigranakert/Diarbekir and Edessa/Urfa. Mazda Publishers.
- Kévorkian, Raymond (2011). The Armenian Genocide: A Complete History. I.B. Tauris.
- Üngör, Ugur Ümit (2012). The Making of Modern Turkey: Nation and State in Eastern Anatolia, 1913-1950. Oxford University Press.
