= Yalaza, Lice =

Village in Turkey

Yalaza
- Neighbourhood
- Location in Turkey
- Coordinates: 38°20′31″N 40°40′52″E
- Country: Turkey
- Province: Diyarbakır
- District: Lice
- Population (2022): 134
- Time zone: UTC+3 (TRT)

Yalaza (Kurdish: Kerwes) is a neighbourhood in the municipality and district of Lice, Diyarbakır Province in Turkey. It is populated by Kurds and had a population of 134 in 2022.
