= Kıyıköy, Lice =

Village in Turkey

Kıyıköy
- Neighbourhood
- Location in Turkey
- Coordinates: 38°25′48″N 40°49′59″E
- Country: Turkey
- Province: Diyarbakır
- District: Lice
- Population (2022): 291
- Time zone: UTC+3 (TRT)

Kıyıköy (Kurdish: Daraqol) is a neighbourhood in the municipality and district of Lice, Diyarbakır Province in Turkey. It is populated by Kurds and had a population of 291 in 2022.
