= Uçarlı, Lice =

Village in Turkey

Uçarlı
- Neighbourhood
- Location in Turkey
- Coordinates: 38°20′42″N 40°35′39″E
- Country: Turkey
- Province: Diyarbakır
- District: Lice
- Population (2022): 199
- Time zone: UTC+3 (TRT)

Uçarlı (Kurdish: Firdês) is a neighbourhood in the municipality and district of Lice, Diyarbakır Province in Turkey. It is populated by Kurds and had a population of 199 in 2022.
