= Ulucak, Lice =

Village in Turkey

Ulucak
- Neighbourhood
- Location in Turkey
- Coordinates: 38°34′20″N 40°43′55″E
- Country: Turkey
- Province: Diyarbakır
- District: Lice
- Population (2022): 25
- Time zone: UTC+3 (TRT)

Ulucak (Kurdish: Haşadere) is a neighbourhood in the municipality and district of Lice, Diyarbakır Province in Turkey. It is populated by Kurds and had a population of 25 in 2022.
