= Türeli, Lice =

Village in Turkey

Türeli
- Neighbourhood
- Location in Turkey
- Coordinates: 38°23′N 40°54′E
- Country: Turkey
- Province: Diyarbakır
- District: Lice
- Population (2022): 186
- Time zone: UTC+3 (TRT)

Türeli (Kurdish: Bêşîşt) is a neighbourhood in the municipality and district of Lice, Diyarbakır Province in Turkey. It is populated by Kurds and had a population of 186 in 2022.
