= Yeşilburç, Lice =

Village in Turkey

Yeşilburç
- Neighbourhood
- Location in Turkey
- Coordinates: 38°27′29″N 40°39′12″E
- Country: Turkey
- Province: Diyarbakır
- District: Lice
- Population (2022): 763
- Time zone: UTC+3 (TRT)

Yeşilburç (Kurdish: Dercimt) is a neighbourhood in the municipality and district of Lice, Diyarbakır Province in Turkey. It is populated by Kurds and had a population of 763 in 2022.
