= Bağlan, Lice =

Village in Turkey

Bağlan
- Neighbourhood
- Location in Turkey
- Coordinates: 38.3296°N 40.7117°E
- Country: Turkey
- Province: Diyarbakır
- District: Lice
- Population (2022): 132
- Time zone: UTC+3 (TRT)

Bağlan (Kurdish: Muşruf) is a neighbourhood in the municipality and district of Lice, Diyarbakır Province in Turkey. It is populated by Kurds and had a population of 132 in 2022.
