= Yamaçlı, Lice =

Village in Turkey

Yamaçlı
- Neighbourhood
- Location in Turkey
- Coordinates: 38°29′9″N 40°34′44″E
- Country: Turkey
- Province: Diyarbakır
- District: Lice
- Population (2022): 23
- Time zone: UTC+3 (TRT)

Yamaçlı (Kurdish: Dizdênî) is a neighbourhood in the municipality and district of Lice, Diyarbakır Province in Turkey. It is populated by Kurds and had a population of 23 in 2022.
