= Akçabudak, Lice =

Village in Turkey

Akçabudak
- Neighbourhood
- Location in Turkey
- Coordinates: 38°35′N 40°41′E
- Country: Turkey
- Province: Diyarbakır
- District: Lice
- Population (2022): 36
- Time zone: UTC+3 (TRT)

Akçabudak (Kurdish: Zengesor) is a neighbourhood in the municipality and district of Lice, Diyarbakır Province in Turkey. It is populated by Kurds and had a population of 36 in 2022.
