= Birlik, Lice =

Village in Turkey

Birlik
- Neighbourhood
- Location in Turkey
- Coordinates: 38.5139°N 40.4825°E
- Country: Turkey
- Province: Diyarbakır
- District: Lice
- Population (2022): 269
- Time zone: UTC+3 (TRT)

Birlik (Kurdish: Elîkan) is a neighbourhood in the municipality and district of Lice, Diyarbakır Province in Turkey. It is populated by Kurds and had a population of 269 in 2022.
