= Kıralan, Lice =

Village in Turkey

Kıralan
- Neighbourhood
- Location in Turkey
- Coordinates: 38°28′42″N 40°33′32″E
- Country: Turkey
- Province: Diyarbakır
- District: Lice
- Population (2022): 283
- Time zone: UTC+3 (TRT)

Kıralan (Kurdish: Zirext) is a neighbourhood in the municipality and district of Lice, Diyarbakır Province in Turkey. It is populated by Kurds and had a population of 283 in 2022.
