= Tuzlaköy, Lice =

Village in Turkey

Tuzlaköy
- Neighbourhood
- Location in Turkey
- Coordinates: 38°29′31″N 40°32′42″E
- Country: Turkey
- Province: Diyarbakır
- District: Lice
- Population (2022): 90
- Time zone: UTC+3 (TRT)

Tuzlaköy (Kurdish: Xweylîn) is a neighbourhood in the municipality and district of Lice, Diyarbakır Province in Turkey. It is populated by Kurds and had a population of 90 in 2022.
