= Dibekköy, Lice =

Village in Turkey

Dibekköy
- Neighbourhood
- Location in Turkey
- Coordinates: 38°24′03″N 40°39′33″E
- Country: Turkey
- Province: Diyarbakır
- District: Lice
- Population (2022): 136
- Time zone: UTC+3 (TRT)

Dibekköy (Kurdish: Dêrxust) is a neighbourhood in the municipality and district of Lice, Diyarbakır Province in Turkey. It is populated by Kurds and had a population of 136 in 2022.
