= Damar, Lice =

Village in Turkey

Damar
- Neighbourhood
- Location in Turkey
- Coordinates: 38°27′7″N 40°41′45″E
- Country: Turkey
- Province: Diyarbakır
- District: Lice
- Population (2022): 21
- Time zone: UTC+3 (TRT)

Damar (Kurdish: Sernis) is a neighbourhood in the municipality and district of Lice, Diyarbakır Province in Turkey. It is populated by Kurds and had a population of 21 in 2022.
