= 1975 Lice earthquake =

Earthquake in Turkey

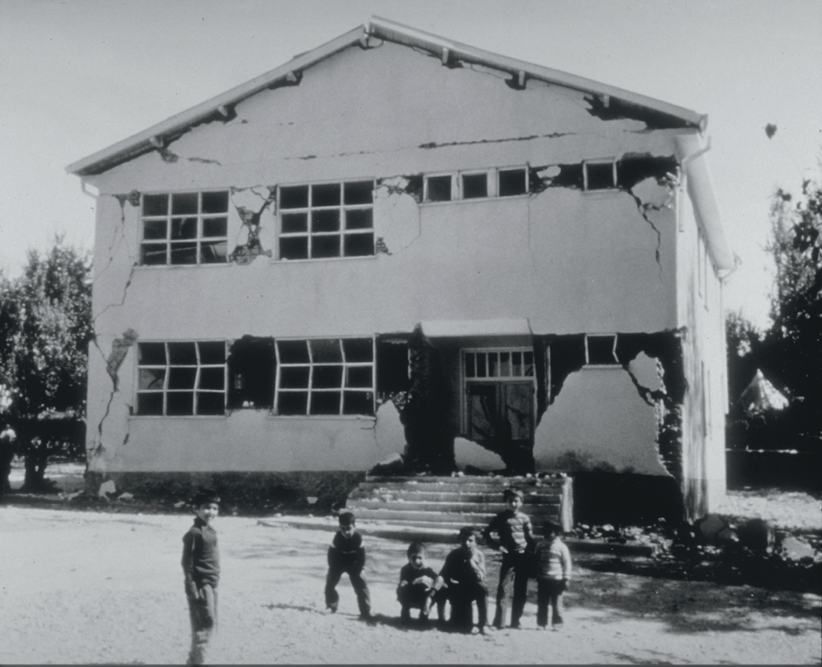

- Location within Turkey
- UTC time: 1975-09-06 09:20:13
- ISC event: 723680
- USGS-ANSS: ComCat
- Local date: 6 September 1975
- Local time: 12:20
- Magnitude: 6.7 M_{s}
- Depth: 26 km (16 mi)
- Epicenter: 38.474°N 40.723°E
- Areas affected: Turkey
- Max. intensity: MMI VIII (Severe)
- Casualties: 2,311 dead

The 1975 Lice earthquake struck the Turkish district of Lice at 12:20 local time (09:20 UTC) on 6 September. The epicenter of the M_{s} 6.7 shock was located near the town of Lice and the maximum felt intensity was VIII (Severe) on the Mercalli intensity scale. More than 2,300 people were killed.

== Tectonic setting ==
The tectonics of Turkey are dominated by the effects of the continuing collision between the African plate and the Eurasian plate. The main result of this collision is the southwestward escape of the Anatolian Plate by displacement along the North Anatolian and East Anatolian Faults. To the east of these faults, the plate boundary is a zone of orthogonal collision, with the relative displacement spread out over a wide zone, continuing as far north as the Greater Caucasus. The largest fault within the plate boundary zone is the west–east trending Bitlis frontal thrust and the 1975 earthquake is thought to have been caused by movement on this structure.

== Earthquake characteristics ==
The mainshock was followed by aftershocks that continued for more than a month. The focal mechanism for the earthquake suggests that it was associated with dominantly reverse movement on a fault plane dipping at 45° to the northwest with a significant sinistral (left lateral) component. Ground deformations were mapped; surface fracturing measuring 17–19 cm (6.7–7.5 in) and left-lateral offsets measuring 13–14 cm (5.1–5.5 in). These deformations were not interpreted as surface ruptures.

== Impact ==
The maximum observed Modified Mercalli intensity was VIII assigned in Lice and the surrounding area in an east–west trend. Maximum damage occurred in a 4,000 km^{2} (1,500 sq mi) area. Seismic shaking lasted for about 20–24 seconds. The main area of damage was located near the towns of Hani, Lice and Kulp. In Lice 12 out of the 13 mahalles (sections) of the town were completely destroyed. Six schools, 6 mosques and 132 commercial buildings were damaged. In the 188 villages surrounding Lice that were affected, 5,555 houses suffered either severe damage or total destruction. The New York Times reported, citing the governor of Diyarbakır, on 7 September that 75 percent of the town's buildings were demolished. At Palu, Elazig Province, the earthquake destroyed 65 buildings and a mosque.

== Response ==
=== National ===
The Turkish Red Crescent established two emergency kitchens, one medical team, tents, blankets and other necessities. Rescue teams dug through rubble during the first night after the earthquake.

A total of 15,000 Turkish soldiers were involved in rescue and relief work, with the first personnel arriving just 3 hours after the earthquake. The government set aside a total of 34 million dollars for repair and reconstruction. On 10 September, the government of Turkey announced they would provide earthquake-resistant homes for the affected residents after being persuaded by opposition political parties, newspapers and Kurdish-minority militants. Süleyman Demirel, then Turkey's prime minister, said they planned to construct 3,000 new homes away from the devastated hillside community.

Just 5 days after the earthquake, following a geological site investigation of suitable sites, the decision was made to relocate the town about 2 km (1.2 mi) south of its previous position. By 29 October 1975, 1,568 houses, 40 shops, a school, a mosque and a bakery were complete.

=== International ===
Financial assistance from the international community, from both government and private sources reached a total of $14,837,058. The largest government contribution was from Saudi Arabia. Aid in the form of food and some other supplies from foreign agencies were treated with suspicion with much unfamiliar tinned food being sold for animal feed.

== See also ==
- List of earthquakes in 1975
- List of earthquakes in Turkey
