= Şenlik, Lice =

Village in Turkey

Şenlik
- Neighbourhood
- Location in Turkey
- Coordinates: 38°31′47″N 40°26′24″E
- Country: Turkey
- Province: Diyarbakır
- District: Lice
- Population (2022): 81
- Time zone: UTC+3 (TRT)

Şenlik (Kurdish: Xiraba) is a neighbourhood in the municipality and district of Lice, Diyarbakır Province in Turkey. It is populated by Kurds and had a population of 81 in 2022.
