= Duruköy, Lice =

Village in Turkey

Duruköy
- Neighbourhood
- Location in Turkey
- Coordinates: 38.4335°N 40.5002°E
- Country: Turkey
- Province: Diyarbakır
- District: Lice
- Population (2022): 909
- Time zone: UTC+3 (TRT)

Duruköy (Kurdish: Dêrqam) is a neighbourhood in the municipality and district of Lice, Diyarbakır Province in Turkey. It is populated by Kurds and had a population of 909 in 2022.
