= Örtülü, Lice =

Village in Turkey

Örtülü
- Neighbourhood
- Location in Turkey
- Coordinates: 38°34′20″N 40°30′59″E
- Country: Turkey
- Province: Diyarbakır
- District: Lice
- Population (2022): 59
- Time zone: UTC+3 (TRT)

Örtülü (Kurdish: Şavêrdiyan) is a neighbourhood in the municipality and district of Lice, Diyarbakır Province in Turkey. It is populated by Kurds and had a population of 59 in 2022.
