= Zümrüt, Lice =

Village in Turkey

Zümrüt
- Neighbourhood
- Location in Turkey
- Coordinates: 38°27′29″N 40°48′00″E
- Country: Turkey
- Province: Diyarbakır
- District: Lice
- Population (2022): 933
- Time zone: UTC+3 (TRT)

Zümrüt (Kurdish: Mêrdînîya) is a neighbourhood in the municipality and district of Lice, Diyarbakır Province in Turkey. It is populated by Kurds and had a population of 933 in 2022.
