= Yolçatı, Lice =

Village in Turkey

Yolçatı
- Neighbourhood
- Location in Turkey
- Coordinates: 38°23′34″N 40°40′50″E
- Country: Turkey
- Province: Diyarbakır
- District: Lice
- Population (2022): 55
- Time zone: UTC+3 (TRT)

Yolçatı (Kurdish: Sîsê) is a neighbourhood in the municipality and district of Lice, Diyarbakır Province in Turkey. It is populated by Kurds and had a population of 55 in 2022.
