= Tepe, Lice =

Village in Turkey

Tepe
- Neighbourhood
- Location in Turkey
- Coordinates: 38°23′11″N 40°44′13″E
- Country: Turkey
- Province: Diyarbakır
- District: Lice
- Population (2022): 335
- Time zone: UTC+3 (TRT)

Tepe (Kurdish: Gir) is a neighbourhood in the municipality and district of Lice, Diyarbakır Province in Turkey. It is populated by Kurds and had a population of 335 in 2022.
