= Çağdaş, Lice =

Village in Turkey

Çağdaş
- Neighbourhood
- Location in Turkey
- Coordinates: 38.3901°N 40.6483°E
- Country: Turkey
- Province: Diyarbakır
- District: Lice
- Population (2022): 86
- Time zone: UTC+3 (TRT)

Çağdaş (Kurdish: Cinêzur) is a neighbourhood in the municipality and district of Lice, Diyarbakır Province in Turkey. It is populated by Kurds and had a population of 86 in 2022.
