= Yusuf Ekinci =

Turkish politician

Yusuf Ekinci (1942, in Diyarbakır – 25 February 1994, in Ankara) was a Turkish politician who was murdered by Turkish deep state in 1994

== Biography ==
He was born in Lice to Kamil Ekinci. In June 1963 he was a student of the Faculty of Law at Ankara University and he was known as a socialist Kurdish nationalist in the school. He was among the members of the youth organization of the Workers Party of Turkey (TİP) which started its activities in Ankara in December 1963, and he worked as the editor-in-chief of the newspaper Emekçi (the Laborer), which was the publication of the Party.

Following his graduation he went to Diyarbakır in April 1969 to do his compulsory practice, and he participated in the rally held here in protest to the draft bill of the Law to Protect the Constitution. During the period of his arrest in 1970 and 1971, he was put on trial on charges of carrying out activities within the Revolutionary East Culture Centers (DDKD). As of 1972 he was working as a lawyer in Diyarbakır trying to strengthen the Kurdish movement.

In the Fourth General Assembly of the TİP held in April 1974, he declared that he had dissident opinions to his brother Tarık Ziya Ekinci, and that his main purpose had been the establishment of “Kurdistan” and that he was a “Kurdish nationalist.” Starting from December 1984 he worked as a lawyer in Ankara.

He was found dead in the Doktorlar region in Gölbaşı District of Ankara on 25 February 1994.
