= Ortaç, Lice =

Village in Turkey

Ortaç
- Neighbourhood
- Location in Turkey
- Coordinates: 38.3382°N 40.6650°E
- Country: Turkey
- Province: Diyarbakır
- District: Lice
- Population (2022): 140
- Time zone: UTC+3 (TRT)

Ortaç (Kurdish: Nenyas) is a neighbourhood in the municipality and district of Lice, Diyarbakır Province in Turkey. It is populated by Kurds and had a population of 140 in 2022.
