= Serince, Lice =

Village in Turkey

Serince
- Neighbourhood
- Location in Turkey
- Coordinates: 38°22′11″N 40°35′33″E
- Country: Turkey
- Province: Diyarbakır
- District: Lice
- Population (2022): 76
- Time zone: UTC+3 (TRT)

Serince, also known as Serin, (Kurdish: Pîrik) is a neighbourhood in the municipality and district of Lice, Diyarbakır Province in Turkey. It is populated by Kurds and had a population of 76 in 2022.
