= Key Monastery =

Tibetan Buddhist monastery in Spiti, Himachal Pradesh, India

Kye Monastery
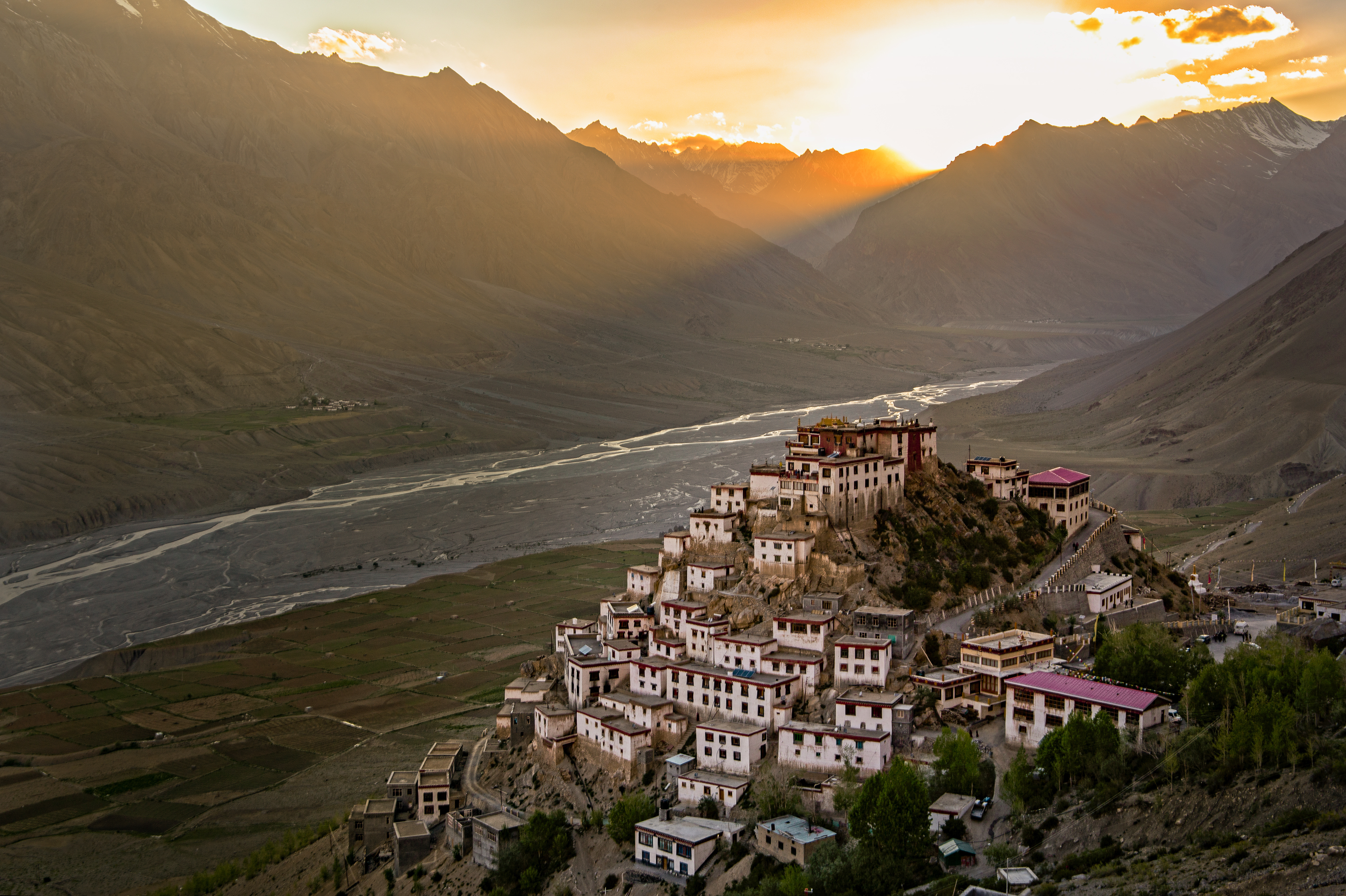

- Location within Himachal Pradesh

Religion
- Affiliation: Tibetan Buddhism
- Sect: Gelug

Location
- Location: Spiti Valley, Himachal Pradesh, Lahaul and Spiti district, India
- Country: India
- Coordinates: 32°17′52″N 78°00′43″E

Architecture
- Style: Dzong
- Founder: Dromtön
- Established: 11th century

Kye Gompa (Tibetan: དཀྱིལ་དགོན་, Wylie: dkyil dgon; also spelled Kyi, Ki, Key, or Kee; pronounced like the English word key) is a Tibetan Buddhist monastery of the Gelugpa sect located on top of a hill at an altitude of 4,166 metres (13,668 ft) above sea level, close to the Spiti River, in the Spiti Valley of Himachal Pradesh, Lahaul and Spiti district, India.

It is the largest monastery of the Spiti Valley and a religious training centre for lamas. It reportedly had 100 monks in 1855.

The monastery is dedicated to Lochen Tulku, the 24th reincarnation of the great translator Lotsawa Rinchen Zangpo.

It is about 12 km (7.5 mi) north of Kaza and 210 km (130 mi) from Manali by road.

== History ==
Kye Gompa is said to have been founded by Dromtön (Brom-ston, 1008–1064 CE), a pupil of the famous teacher, Atisha, in the 11th century. This may, however, refer to a now destroyed Kadampa monastery at the nearby village of Rangrik, which was probably destroyed in the 14th century when the Sakya sect rose to power with Mongol assistance.

In the mid-17th century, during the reign of the Fifth Dalai Lama, Kye was extensively plundered and damaged by the Mongols, and became a Gelugpa establishment. Around 1821, it was sacked again during the wars between Ladakh and Kulu. In 1841, during the Dogra–Tibetan war, it was severely damaged by the Dogra army under Ghulam Khan and Rahim Khan. Later that same year, it was also attacked by Sikhs. In the 1840s, it was ravaged by fire and, in 1975, a violent earthquake caused further damage which was repaired with the help of the Archaeological Survey of India and the State Public Works Department.

The walls of the monastery are covered with paintings and murals, an example of 14th-century monastic architecture, which developed as the result of Chinese influence.

Kye monastery has a collection of ancient murals and books, including Buddha images.

There are three floors; the first is mainly underground and used for storage. One room, called the Tangyur is painted with murals. The ground floor has a decorated Assembly Hall and cells for many monks.

Kye Gompa now belongs to the Gelugpa sect, along with Tabo Monastery and Dhankar Gompa, one of three in Spiti.

The monastery of Kee, for instance, accommodates nearly 250 monks, who reside within the sacred walls throughout the year. Some monks go to South Indian Monasteries during winters, the rest of them stay inside the monastery walls. These monasteries have their regular heads;. The current head of Kee Monastery is from Kinnaur district of Himachal Pradesh. He is 19th birth of lotsawa rinchen zangpo.

A celebration of its millennium was conducted in 2000 in the presence of the Dalai Lama. A new Prayer Hall was inaugurated on 3 August 2000 by the Fourteenth Dalai Lama. It was presented through a tableau in the 69th Republic Day celebration held at Delhi.

In recent times the monastery has also hosted the "Kachen Dugyal Memorial Old Aged – Handicapped Society" which provide accommodation for a number of elderly and disabled people.

== Access ==
Key monastery lies just above the NH 505. There is also a helipad nearby.

== Gallery ==
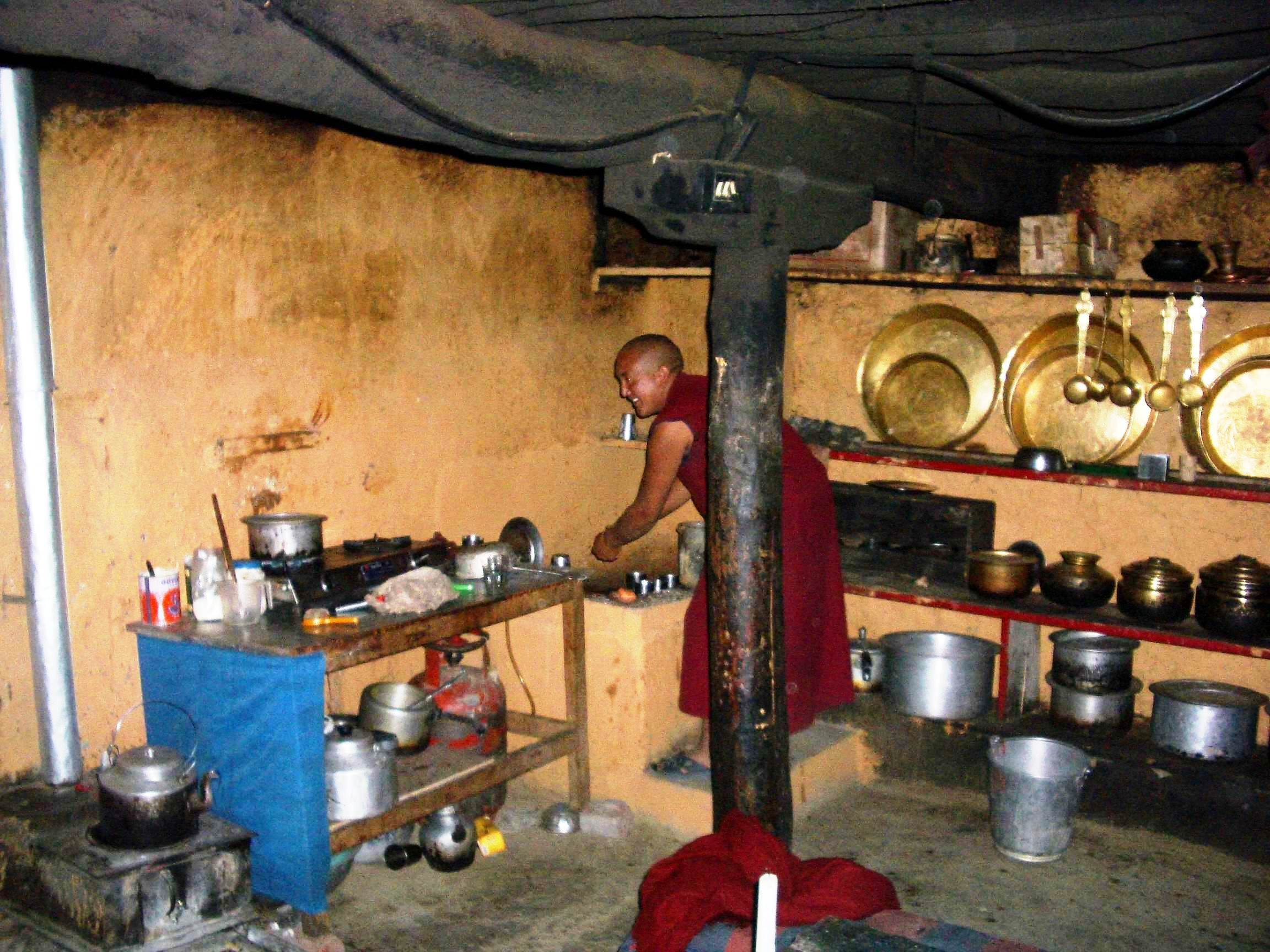
Key monastery kitchen, Spiti, India. 2004

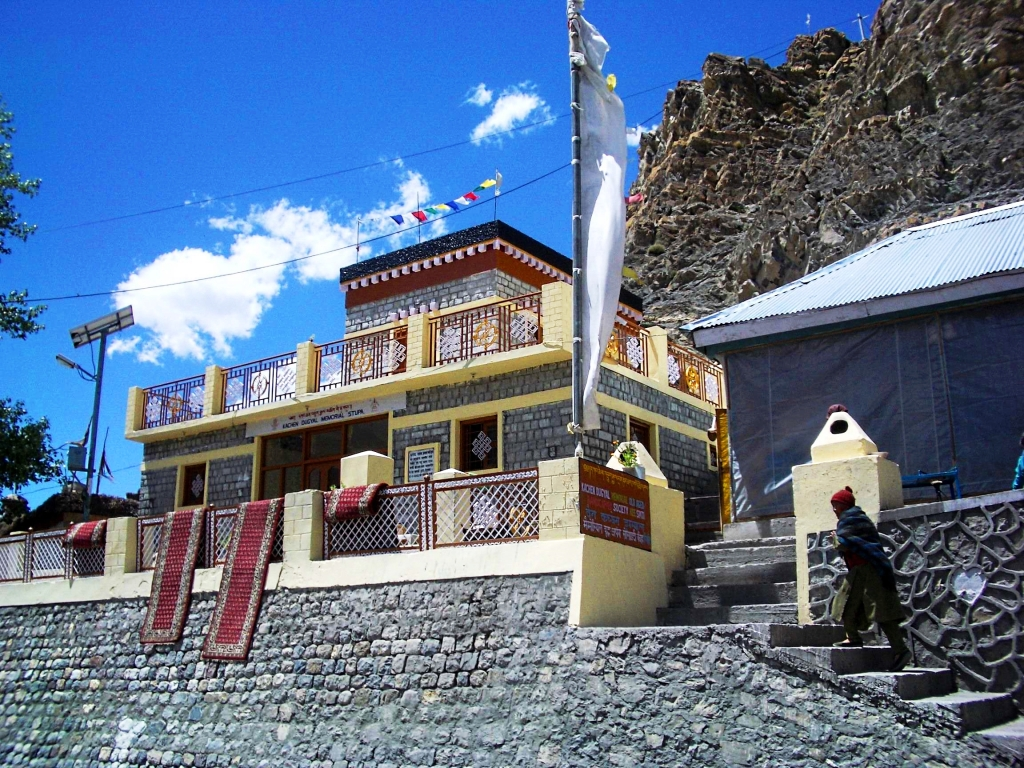
Kachen Dugyal Memorial Old Aged – Handicapped Society, Spiti Monastery, 2004

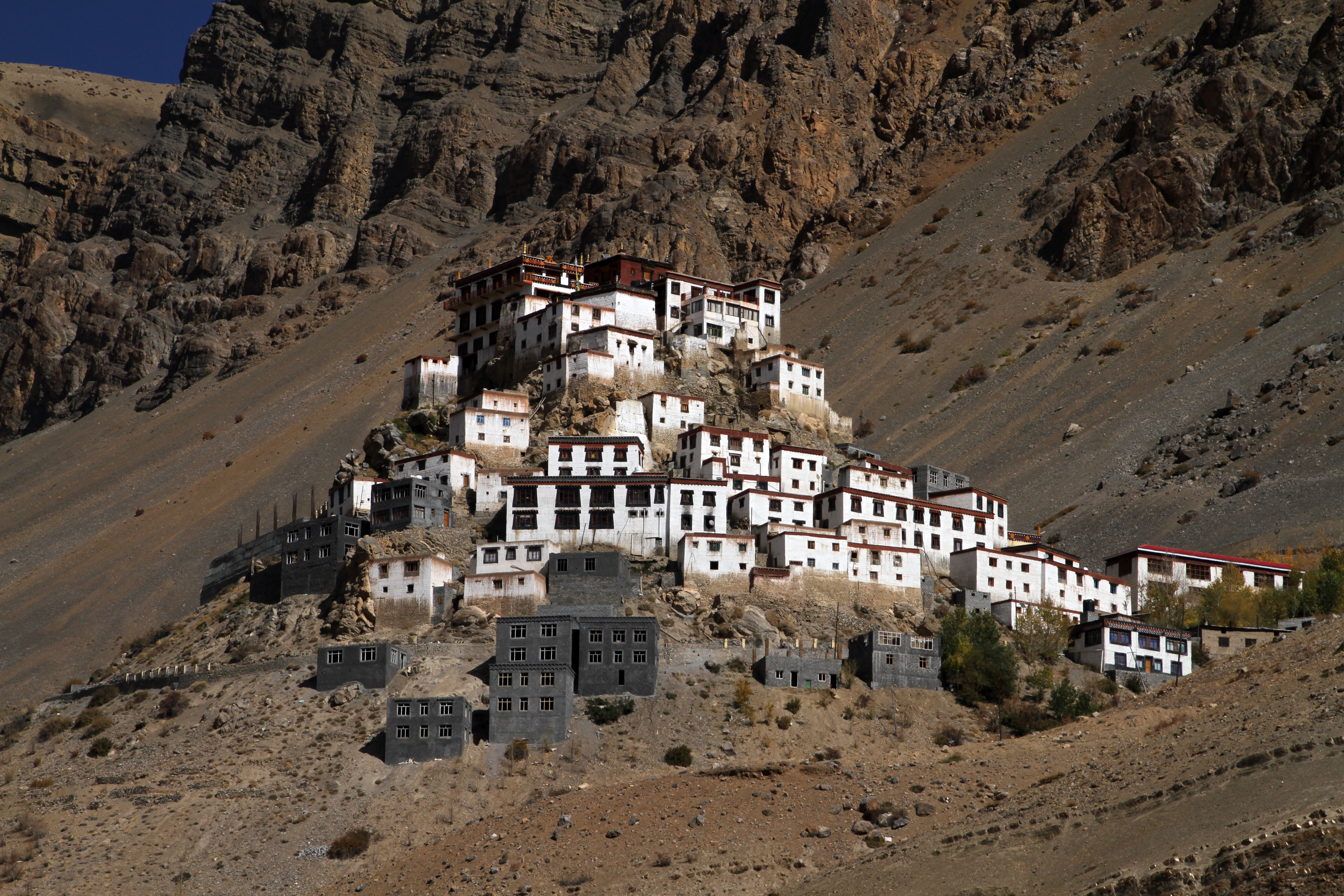
Close-up

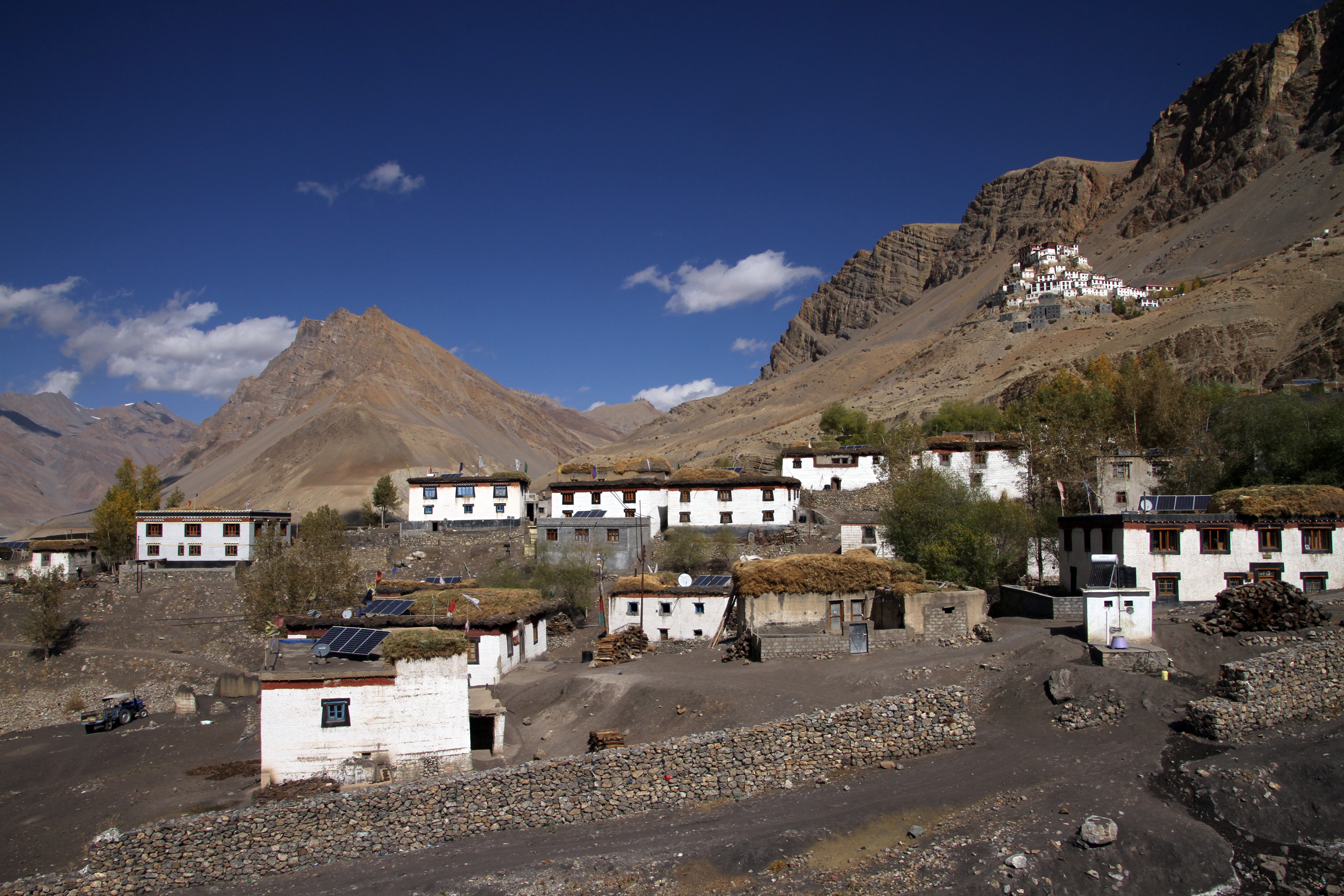
Kye village

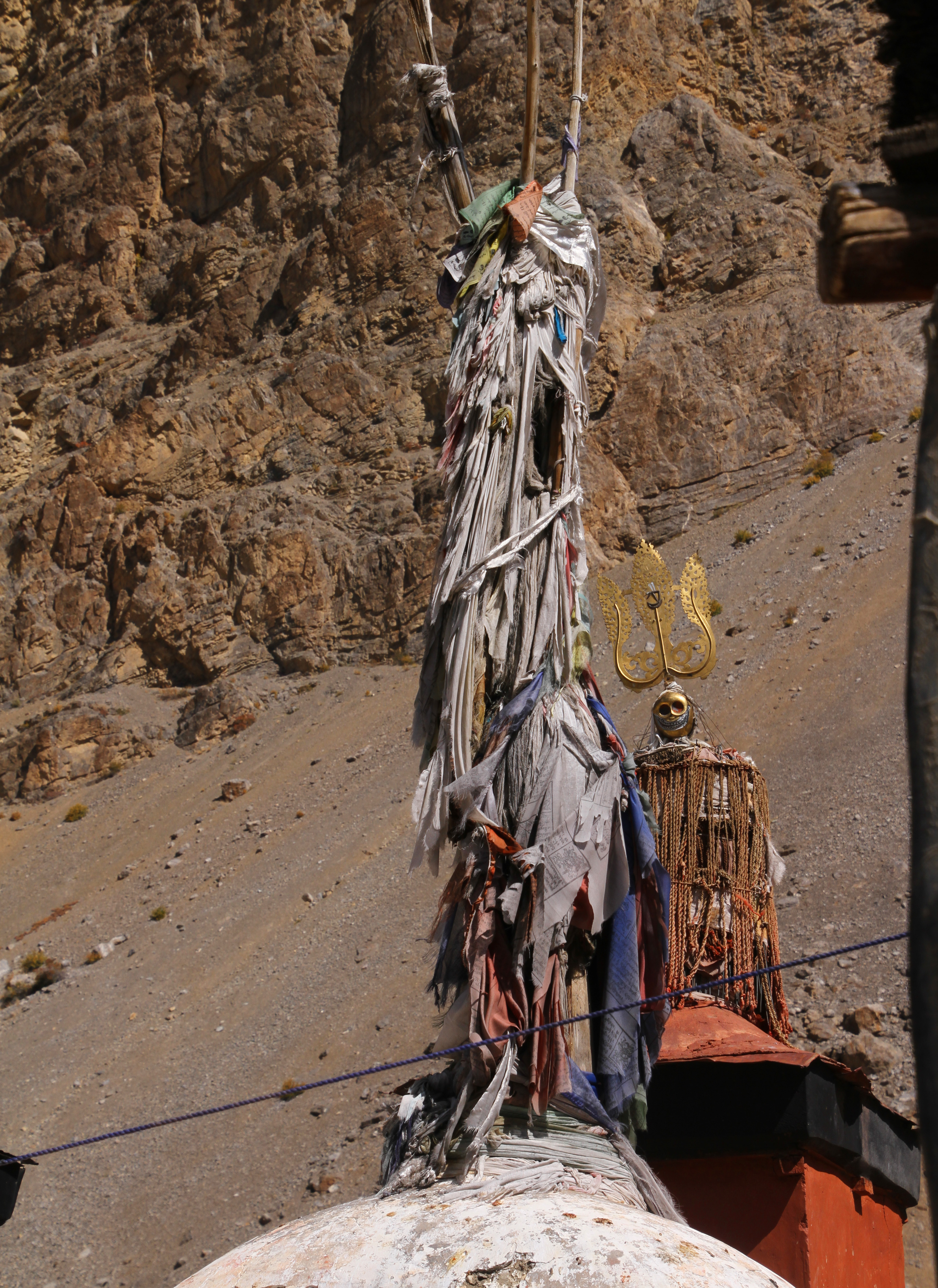
Spiritual signs

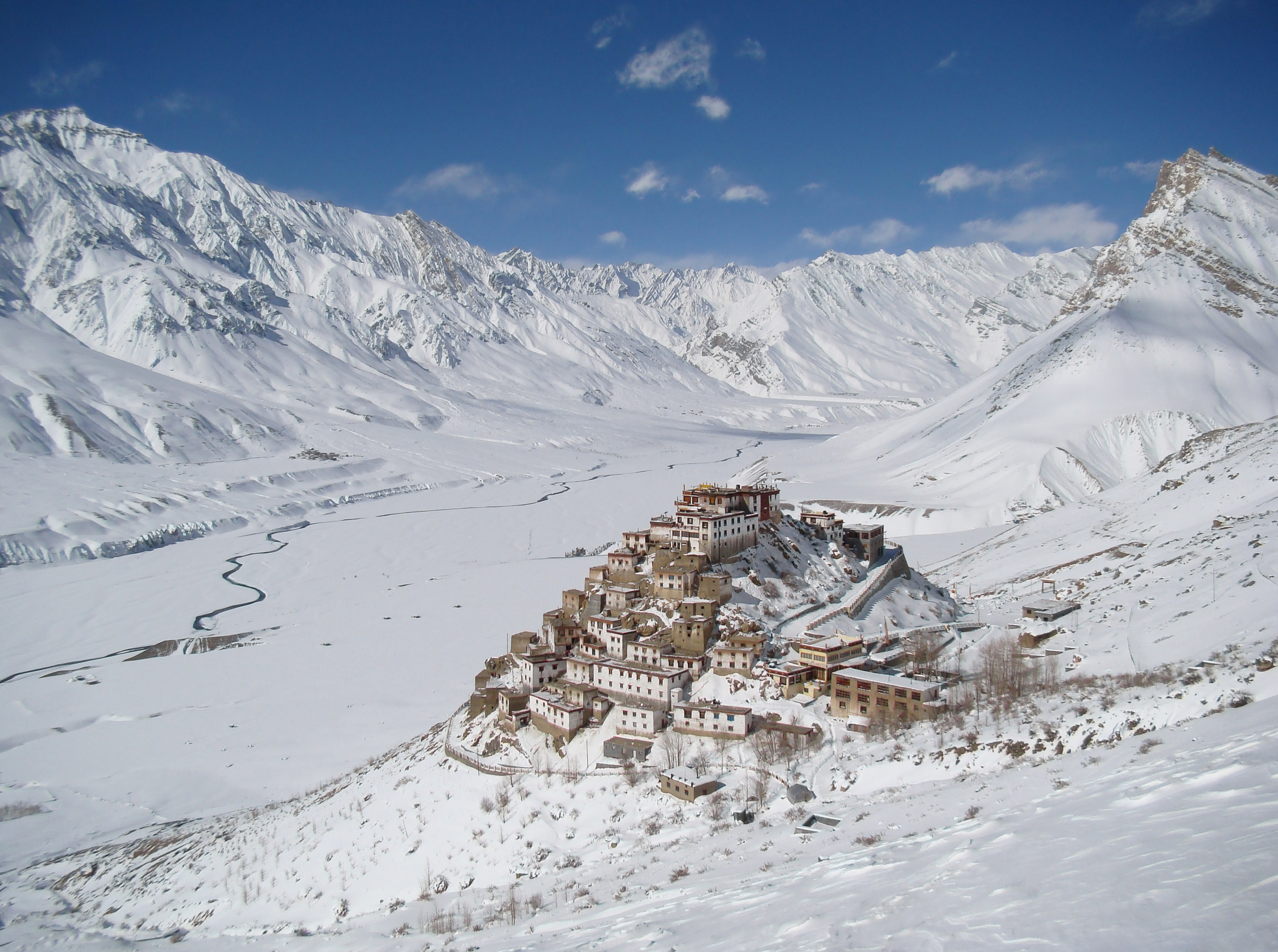
Covered in snow in winter

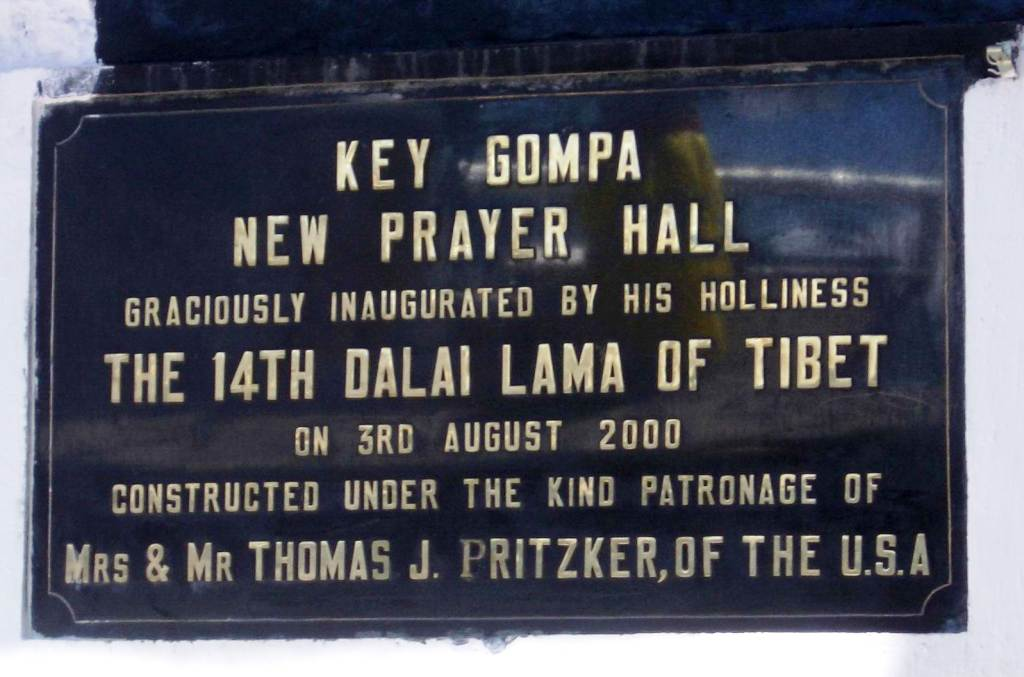
Dedication plaque

== See also ==
- List of highest towns by country
