= Losar Khas =

Government office in Himachal Pradesh

- village
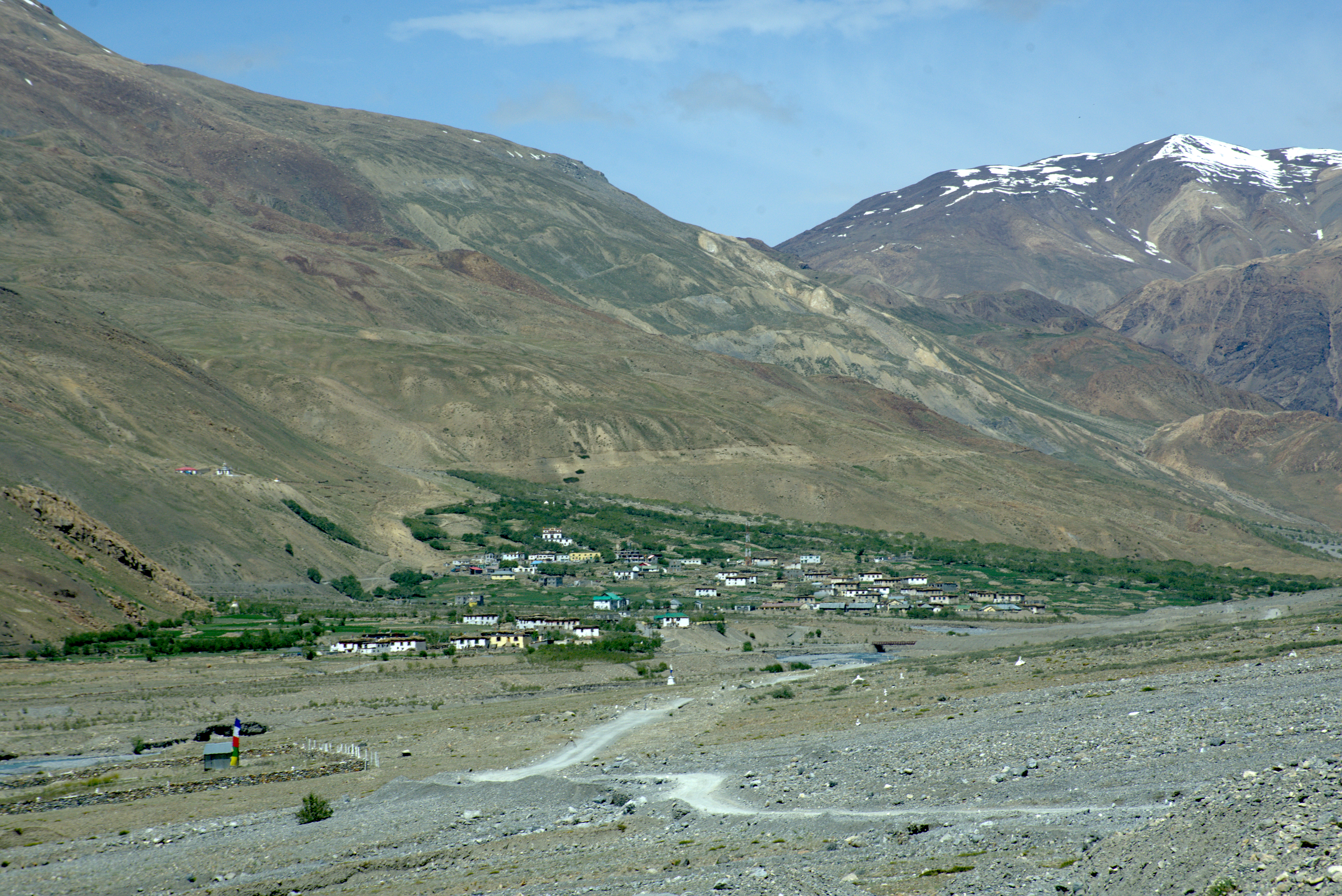
- View from NH-505, east entrance. Jun '18

- Location within Himachal Pradesh
- Coordinates: 32.4375°N 77.7506°E
- Country: India
- State: Himachal Pradesh

Government
  - Type: Panchayati raj
  - Body: Losar Gram Panchayat

Area
  - Total: 3.60 km^{2} (1.39 sq mi)
- Elevation: 4,090 m (13,420 ft)

Population (2011)
  - Total: 320
  - Density: 89/km^{2} (230/sq mi)

Languages
  - Official: Bhoti, Hindi
- Time zone: UTC+5:30 (IST)
- Postal code: 172114
- Vehicle registration: HP-
- Website: hplahaulspiti.nic.in

Losar Khas or Losar is a village on the right bank of the Spiti River in District Lahaul Spiti in the state of Himachal Pradesh, India. The Losar Gram Panchayat located in Losar is a local government body for the village of Losar Khas and 12 nearby villages in Development Block Spiti. Losar is located on NH-505 between Kaza in Spiti and Gramphoo in Lahaul.

== History ==
In 1868, Capt. A.F.P. Harcourt, Assistant Commissioner, Kooloo (Kullu) Sub-Division, reported that Losur (Losar) village was the first human habitation on the Spiti River. The valley was destitute of timber except for a few stunted willow trees.

== Geography ==
Losar Khas is a small village on the right bank of the Spiti River. Located on NH-505, 58 kilometres (36 mi) from Kaza, Himachal Pradesh and 78 kilometres (48 mi) from Gramphoo. It covers an area of 360 hectares (890 acres) and is at an elevation of 4,090 metres (13,420 ft). The forested area in the village is 61.9 ha (153 acres).

=== Climate ===
During his expedition in 1868, Harcourt observed the climate of Spiti was drier and colder than Lahaul, rainfall was very infrequent, beyond the influence of the monsoons. Days were hot in summer but nights cold. The strong winds abraded the exposed skin.

== Demographics ==
The population of Losar Khas as of the 2011 Census was 320 in 65 households. Of these, 166 persons or 51.95% are female, and 57 persons or 17.8% are in the age group 0-6. Scheduled Tribes comprise about 99.1% of the population. The main religions are Buddhism and Hinduism. The main language is Bhoti. The literacy rate in 2011 was 71.9%, with male literacy higher at 77.9% and female literacy lower at 66.3%.

== Transport ==
Losar is served by public and private bus services along NH-505. Taxis and vans are available for hire.

== Agriculture ==
In 1868, Harcourt observed that the soil in Spiti yielded only one crop a year. Sowing took place in May and the harvest in September with mainly Yak used for ploughing. The main crops of the region were a fine hexagonal wheat, peas, mustard and two kinds of barley. There was no fruit. Irrigation was done using long channels winding along the terrain, often for many miles, from streams.

== Amenities ==
Losar has a Branch Post Office (Delivery Office) with pincode 172114. As of the 2011 Census, Losar has a primary school. For higher classes, children have to commute to schools in nearby villages. There is a Primary Health Centre (PHC) and a Veterinary Hospital.

== Governance (Gram Panchayat) ==
The Gram Panchayat of Losar or Losar Gram Panchayat is a government office and local self-government body that governs the village of Losar Khas and 12 nearby villages in Development Block Spiti of District Lahaul Spiti.

=== Villages ===
The Gram Panchayat governs 13 villages.

| Village name | Polling Station No. | Type |
|---|---|---|
| Chichong | 1 | Rural |
| Dhar Chho Chho Dain | 2 | Rural |
| Dhar Dindi | 3 | Rural |
| Dhar Fagdansa | 4 | Rural |
| Dhar Kilung | 5 | Rural |
| Dhar Latothanmo | 6 | Rural |
| Dhar Pindo | 7 | Rural |
| Dhar Soksa | 8 | Rural |
| Dumley | 9 | Rural |
| Hansa | 10 | Rural |
| Kaito | 11 | Rural |
| Kyamo | 12 | Rural |
| Losar Khas | 13 | Rural |

== See also ==
- Lahaul and Spiti district
