= Lhalung Monastery =

Coordinates: 32.146°N 78.235°E

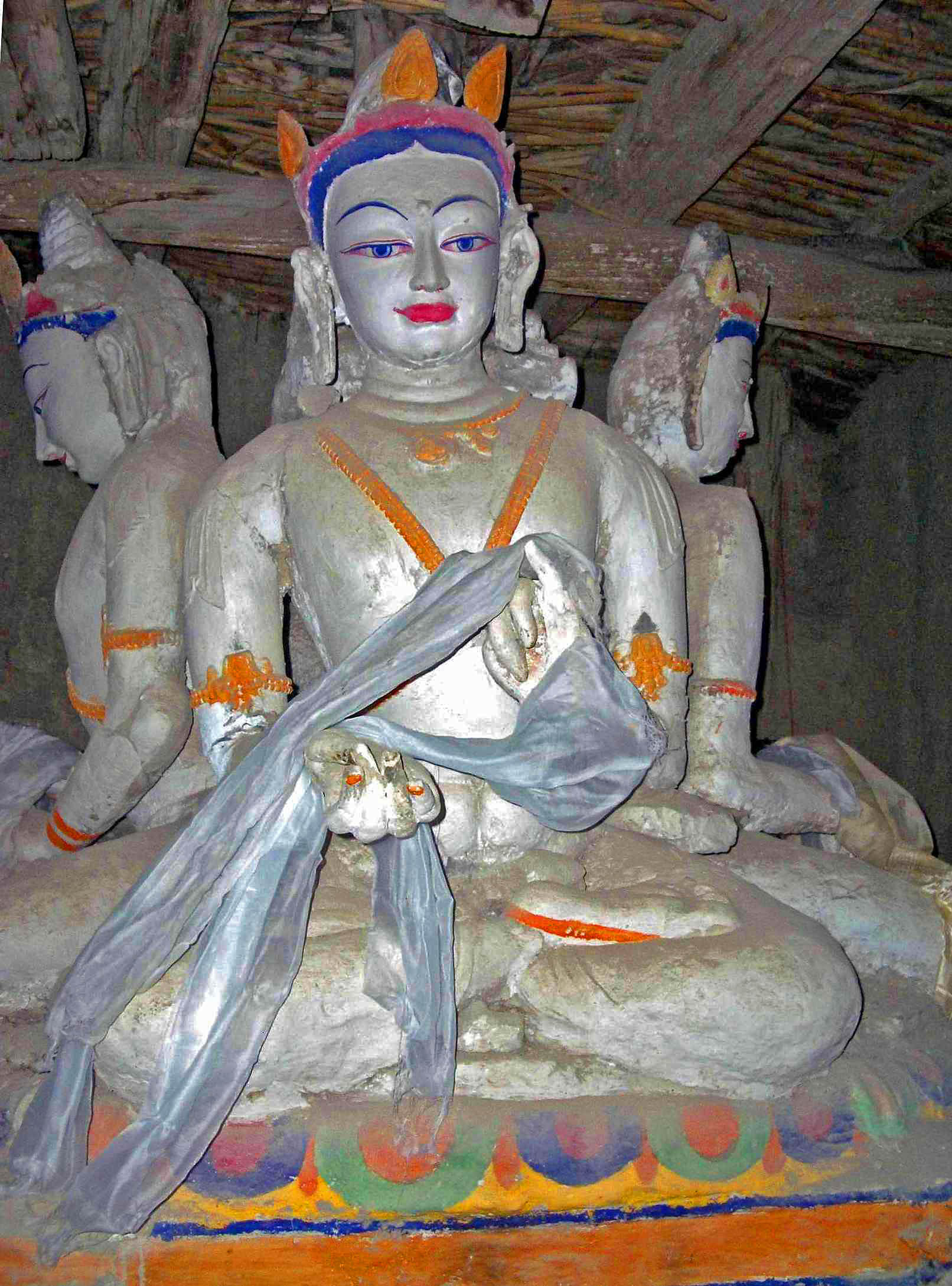
- Old statues. Lhalung Gompa.

Religion
- Affiliation: Tibetan Buddhism

Location
- Location: Spiti, Himachal Pradesh, India
- Country: India
- Interactive map of Lhalung Monastery

Architecture
- Established: 10th century

Lhalung Monastery, Lhalun Monastery or Lalung Monastery (also known as the Sarkhang or Golden Temple), was one of the earliest monasteries founded in Spiti, Himachal Pradesh, India, by the great Tibetan Buddhist lotswa (translator) Rinchen Zangpo, the king of western Himalayan Kingdom of Guge during the late 10th century CE. The altitude of the neighbouring village of Lhalun is 3,658 metres (12,001 feet).

The name Lhalun literally means 'land of the gods' (lha = deities, devtas; lung = land, area) and it is said that the Lhalung Devta is head of all the Devtas of the valley and emerges from the Tangmar mountain beyond the village. This mountain is said to change colour depending on the moods of the devtas or deities; red showing anger, yellow, happiness, etc.

The village has 45 homes is 14 km from the main road and is the largest in the Lingti valley. At some places remains of an ancient wall encircling all the monastery buildings may be found. It is probable that, like Tabo, it was designed as a choshor site, a place for learning and debate as opposed to a simple village monastery or a chapel for worship by the local people. There is also a sacred tree here which may be as old as the earliest monastery.

"The Lha-lun monastery, built by Rin-chen-bZang-po, was originally a Kah-dam-pa (Kadampa) establishment to which the Great Lotsaba belonged. But it might have turned into a Sa-kya-pa (Sakyapa) stronghold in the 14th century. Some of the damaged temples at Lha-lun may be the spoils of that period. In the 17th century, this monastery was annexed to the Ge-lug-pa (Gelugpa) fold by the Mongold despite the Sa-kya-pa (Sakyapa) resistance and, a loss of a few more temples. Thus out of the nine temples of the Lotsaba's time, only one now remains...."

For a sketched floor plan of the one remaining temple of Lhalung Monastery see Handa (1987), p. 87.

== Gallery ==
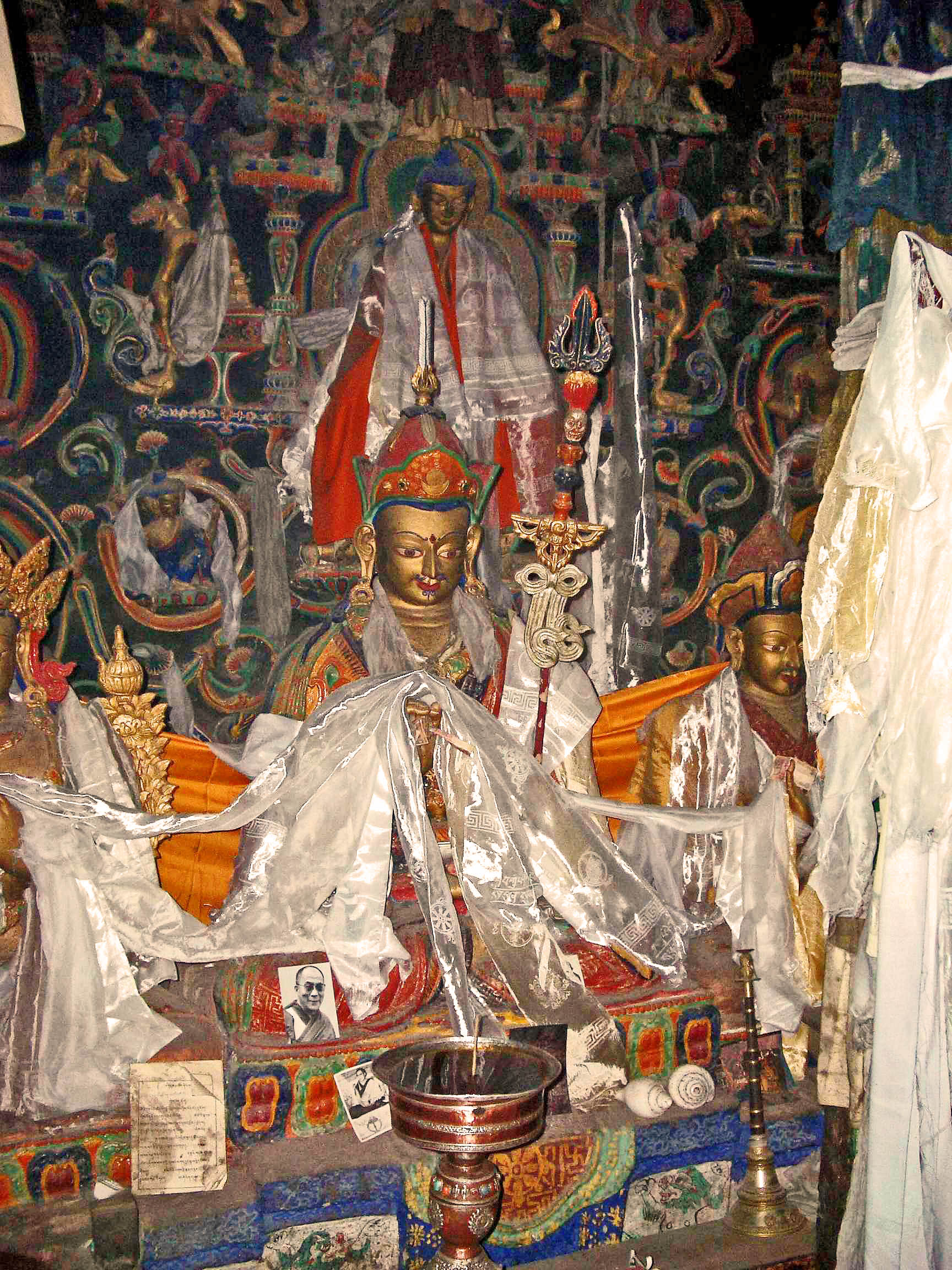
Altar with Guru Rinpoche

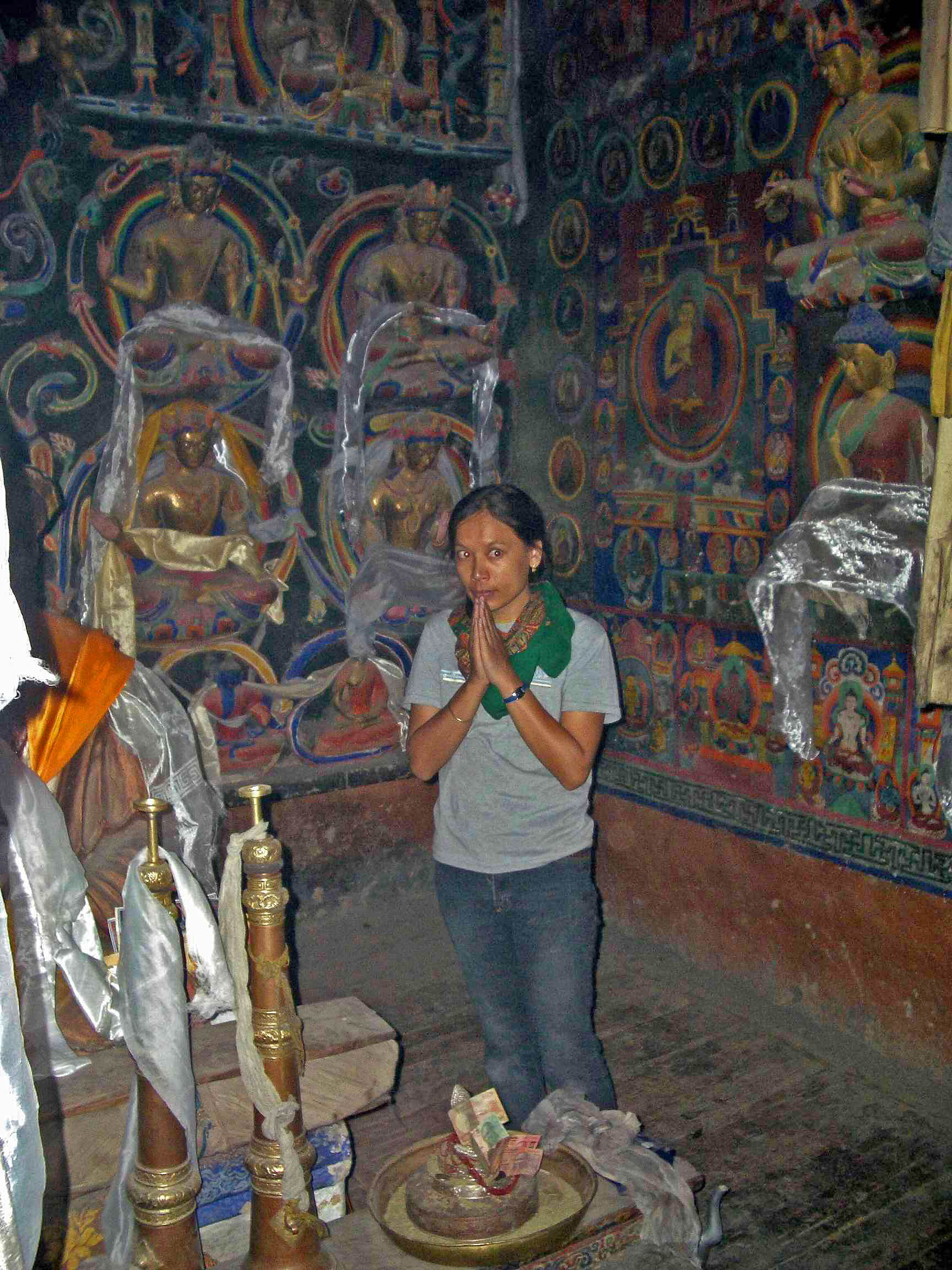
Young woman making offerings. Lhalung Gompa. 2004.

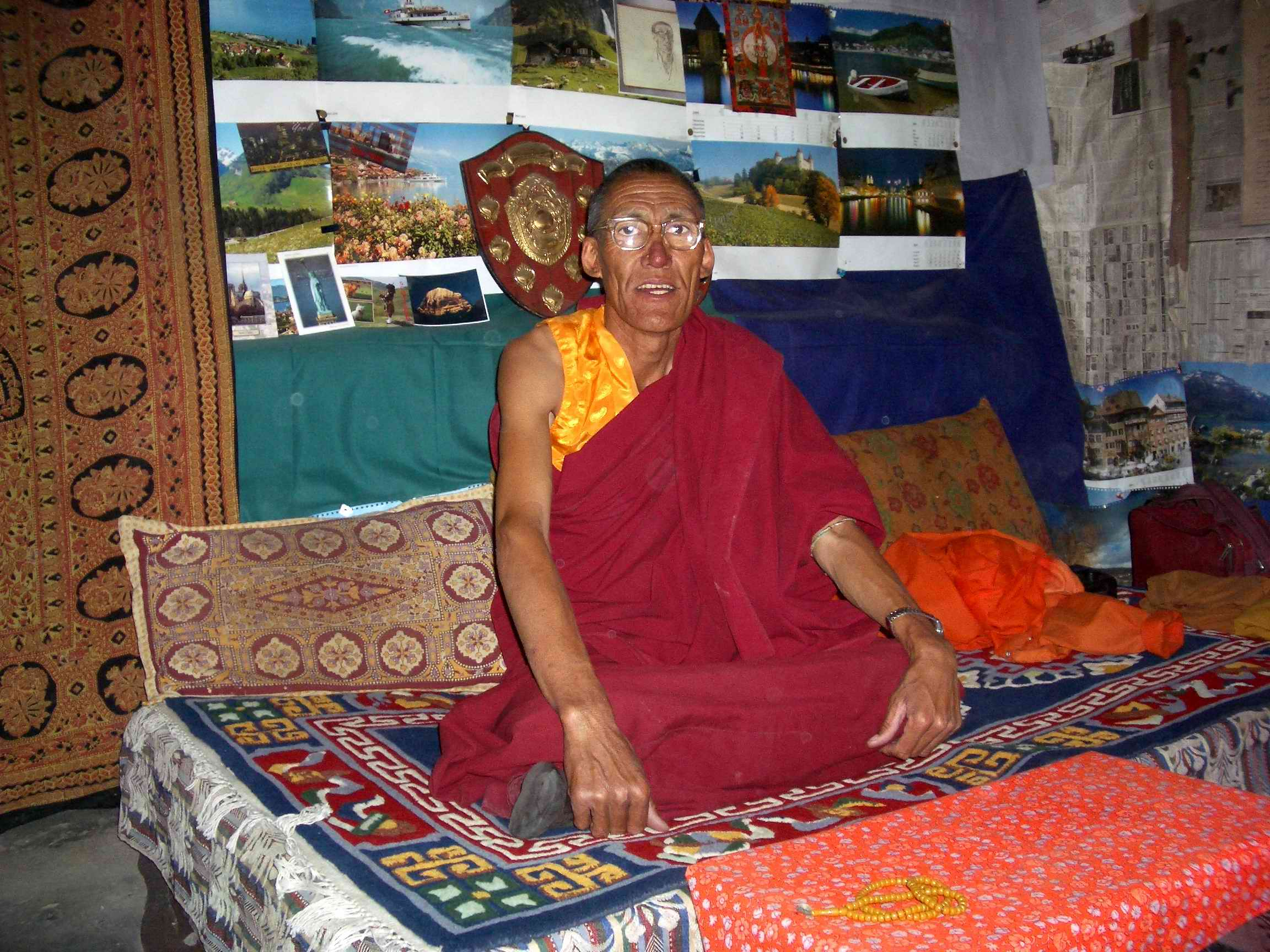
Abbot of Lhalung Gompa. 2004.

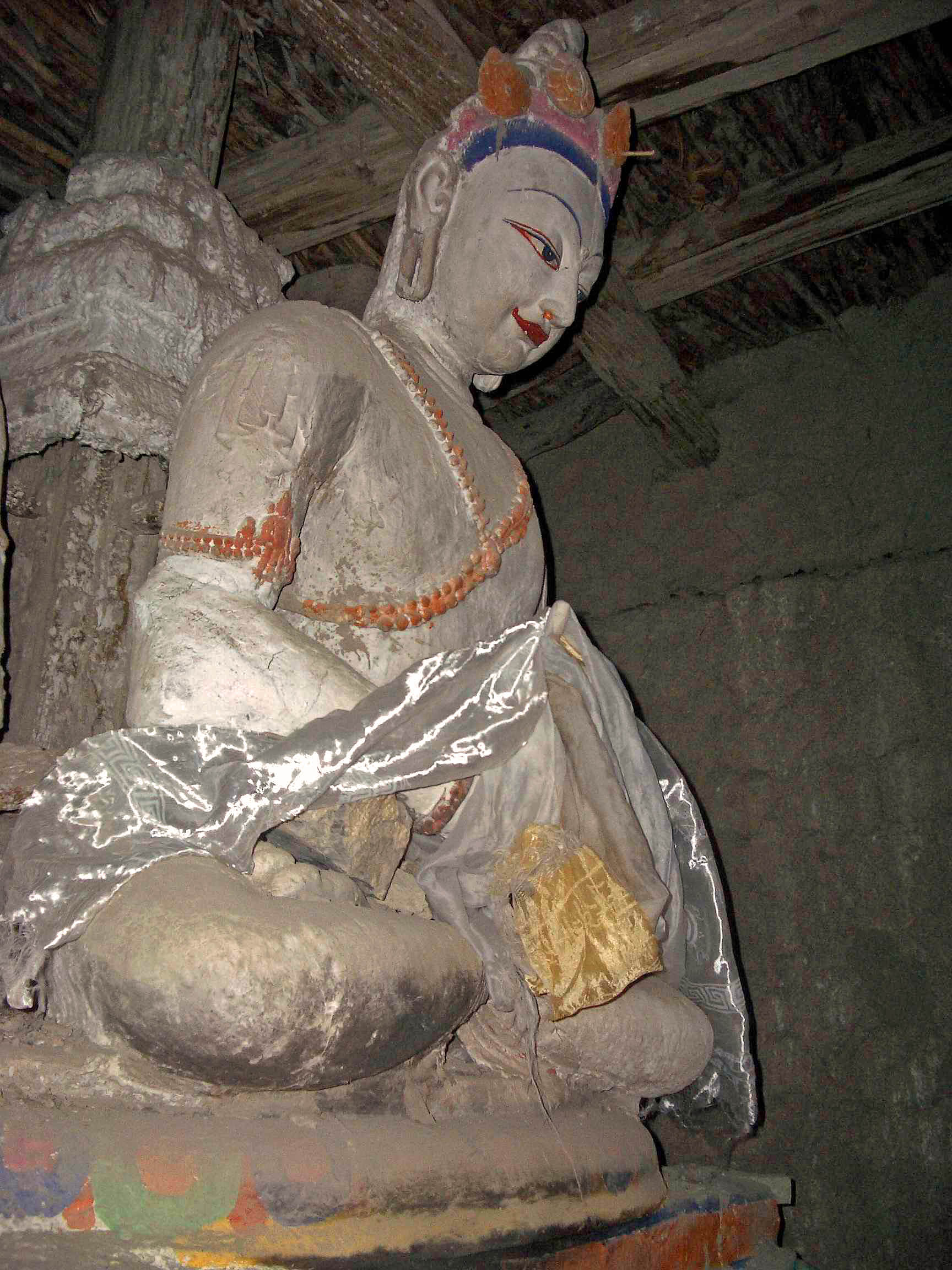
Lhalung. Old statue.

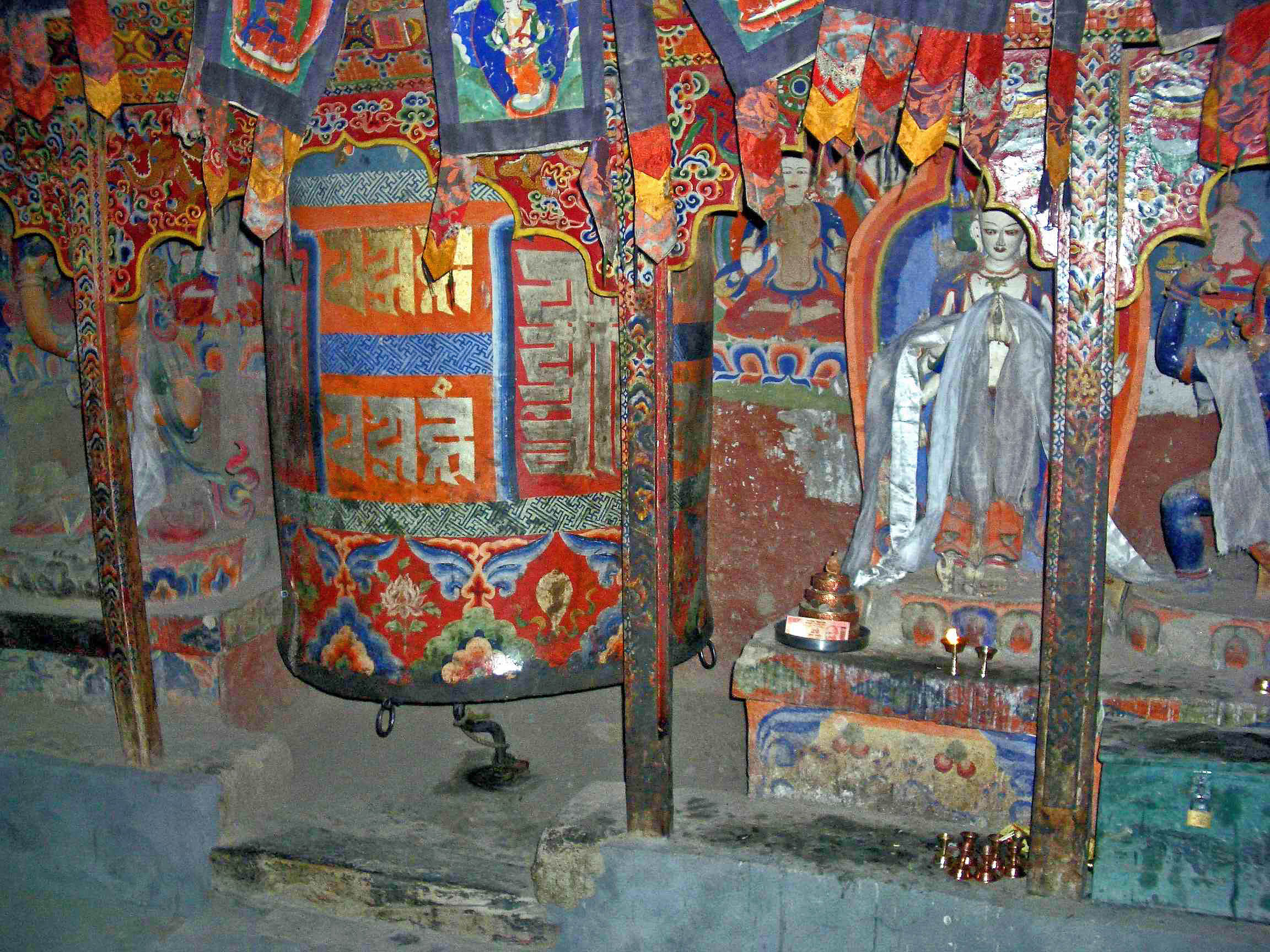
Lhalung Gompa prayer wheel

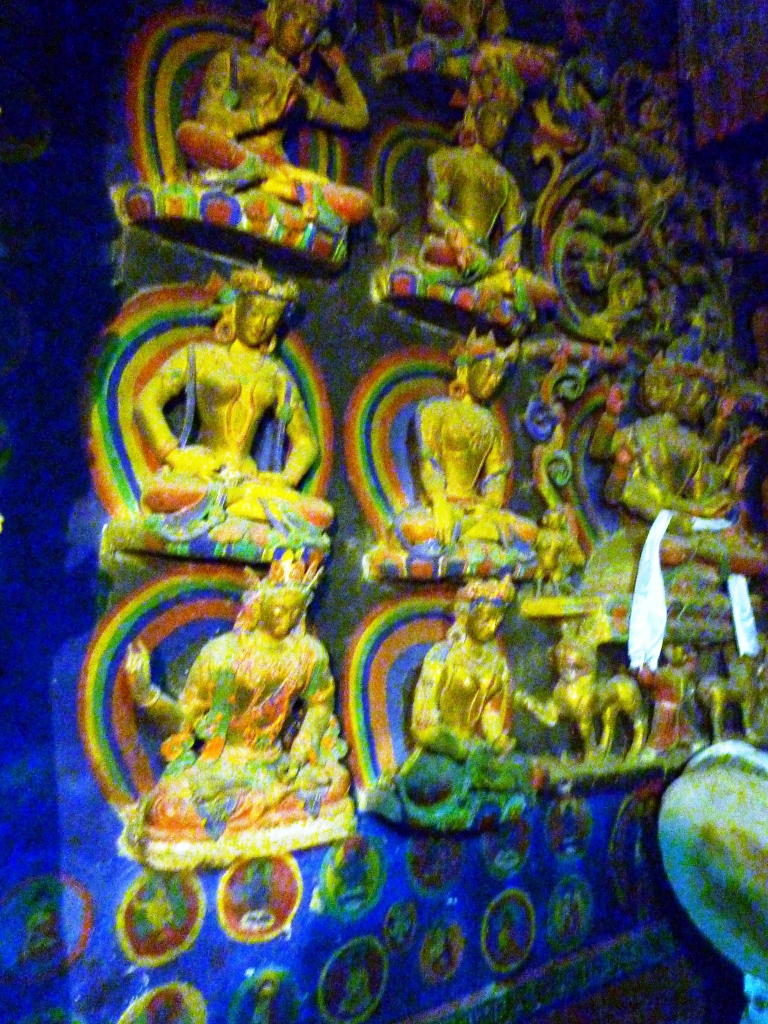
Lhalung – gilded wooden figures

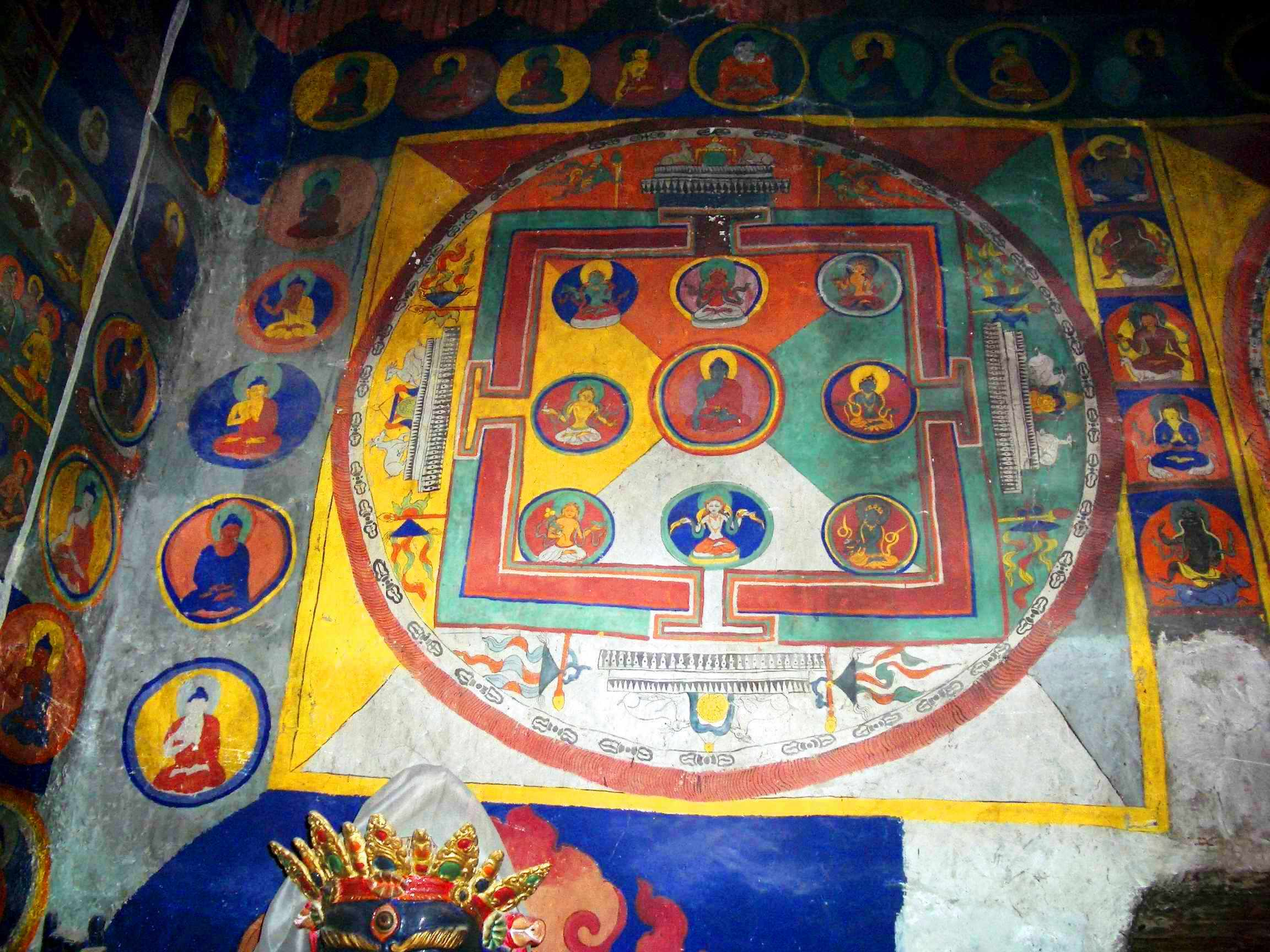
Lalung Gompa mandala wall painting
