= Shilla (mountain) =

Mountain in India

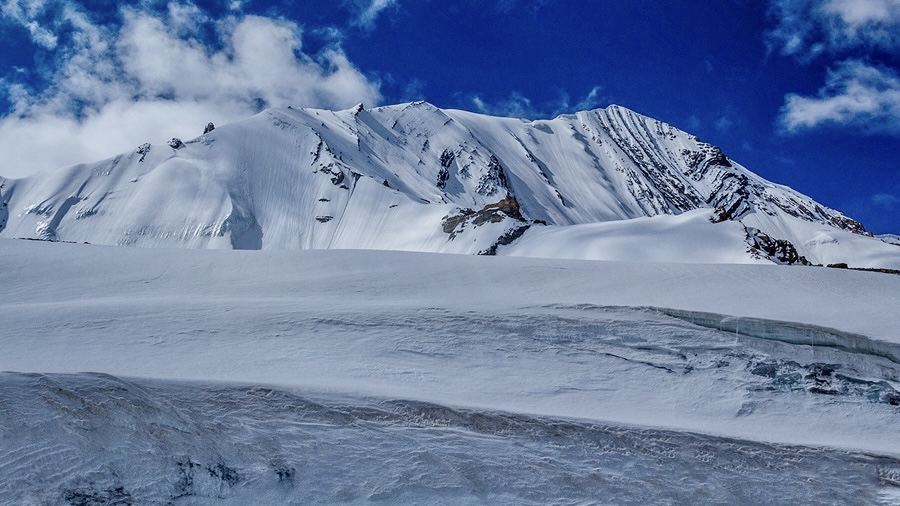
- North west view of Shilla

Highest point
- Elevation: 6,132 m (20,118 ft)
- Coordinates: 32°24′20.88″N 78°12′1.38″E

Geography
- Location within Himachal Pradesh
- Location: Kinnaur district, Himachal Pradesh, India
- Parent range: Himalayas

Shilla is a mountain peak close to Spiti Valley, part of the Himalaya mountains. Its peak is 6,132 metres (20,118 ft) above sea level. (Note: Many sources claim that the peak is 7,025 metres (23,048 ft) high, based on an erroreous recording made in Survey of India maps in early days. The error is now recognised.) It is in Himachal Pradesh in Northern India. The name may be derived from: Shi = death, Shi-la = range or peak death. Other meanings locally offered are 'a place of monastery' or 'a gateway to heaven'. The Shilla peak is on the divide between Lingti and Shilla Nullah/nala.

== Climbing history ==
Year	Party
1860	Climbed by an unnamed Khalasi of the Survey of India.
1952	Recce by a South African party (J. de V. Graff and K. E. Snelson)
1966	Climbed by an Indian team (R. J. Kumar) on 19 and 20 July Team Members : R JaiKumar, Harish Shah, Ramadan Prabhu, G. Srikanth, VV Srinivasan, George Vershese, Jagadish Kumar Sherpa : Da Dhendu, Nim Phutar, Pemba Norbu, Ang Dorte, Nim Tenzing, Lakpa Norbu, Sona Ladakhi : Wangyal, Sonam, Namgyal, Ringzing, Tsang Po
1985	Climbed by an Indian team (S. Bhattacharya) on 31 August
1985	Climbed by an Indian team (S. Roy Chaudhury)
1987	Attempted by an Indian team (Harish Kapadia) from north and east cols.

== Bibliography ==
- Kapadia, Harish (1999), Spiti: Adventures in the Trans-Himalaya, Indus Publishing, ISBN 978-81-7387-093-4
