= Buddhism in Switzerland =

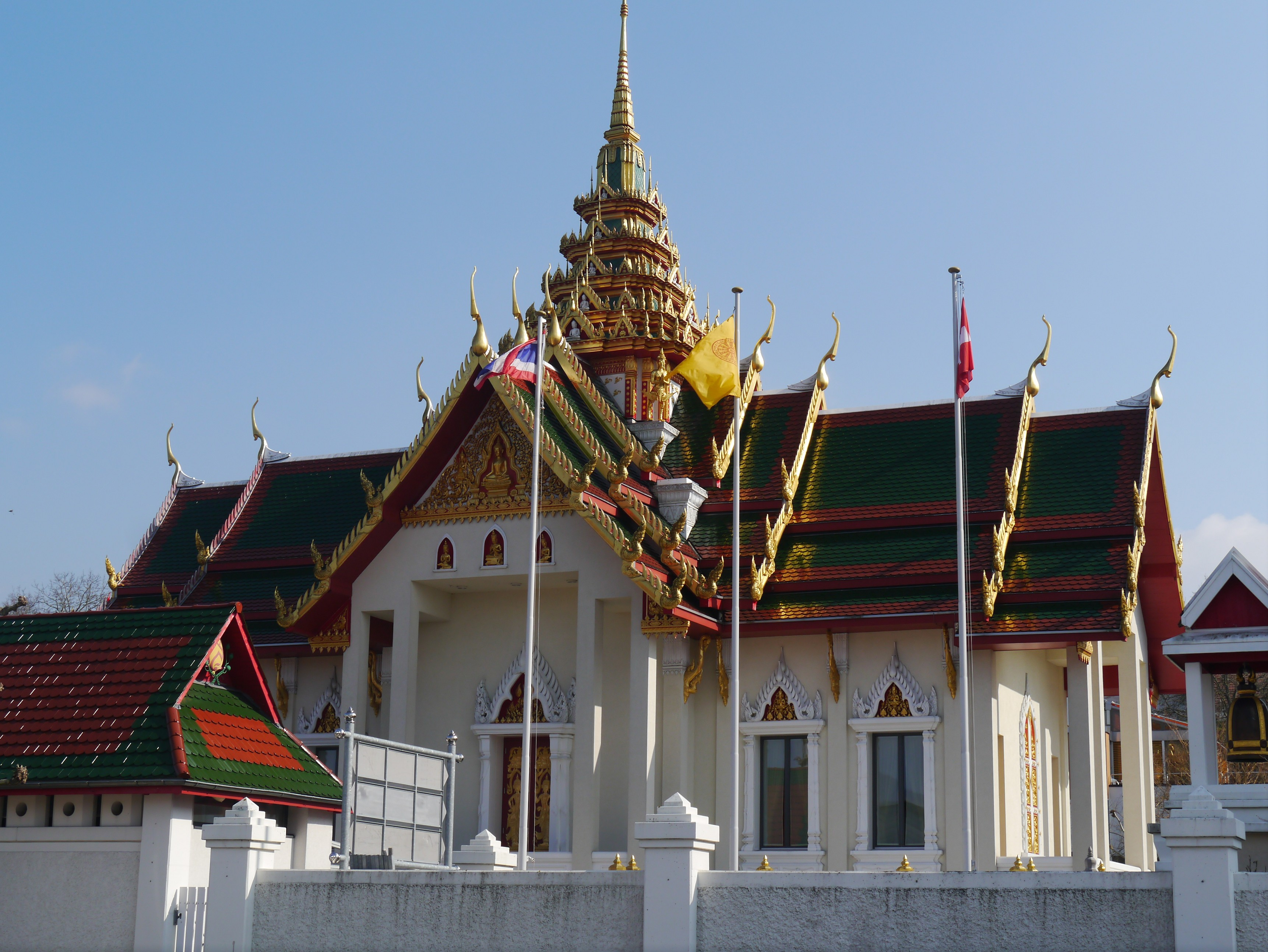
Wat Srinagarindravararam in Gretzenbach

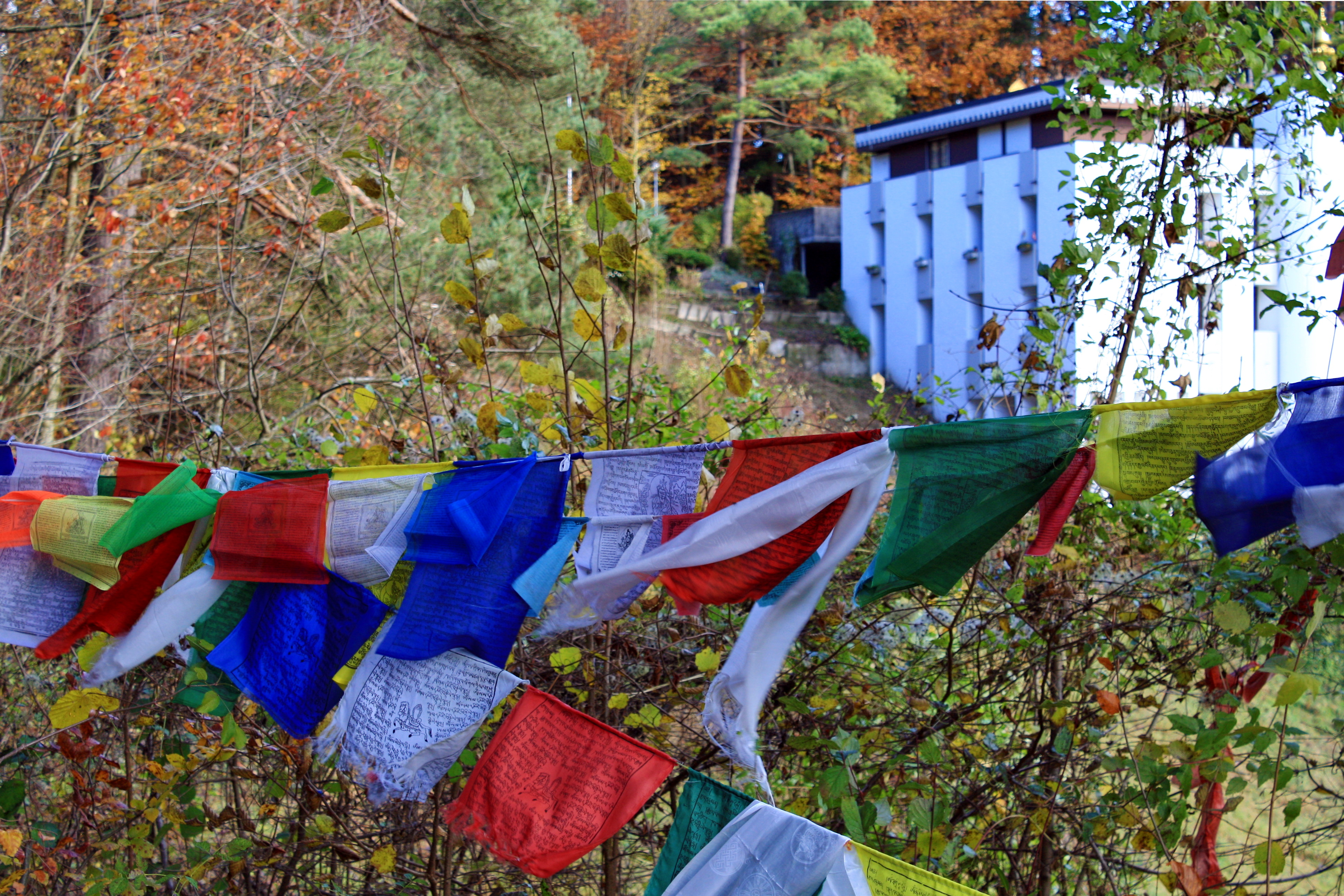
The Tibet Institute Rikon located in Zell-Rikon in the Töss Valley (November 2009)

Buddhism is a minority religion in Switzerland. According to the 2000 census, 21,305 Swiss residents (0.29% of the total population) self-identified as Buddhists. About a third of them were born in Thailand.

== History ==
Interest in Buddhism in Switzerland emerged at the beginning of the 20th century, sparked by allusions to the religion by Theosophy and some philosophical schools. An early Buddhist center was established in Lausanne, around 1910, by the German monk Nyanatiloka. In the 1920s and 1930s, a number of groups were formed in the regions around Zurich and Lausanne. A Buddhist group in Zurich, founded in 1942, published for many years the Buddhist journal Die Einsicht. In the 1970s, a group in French-speaking Switzerland was formed in Lausanne by Georges Bex, who had been ordained a monk in Thailand. During the same period, various Buddhist schools were established in Switzerland, notably Pure Land Buddhism, in Geneva and Yverdon, and in 1978 the Swiss Buddhist Union (Schweizerische Buddhistische Union / Union bouddhiste suisse / Unione Buddhista Svizzera) was founded.

Immigration from Asian countries, mostly from Cambodia, Thailand, Tibet and Vietnam resulted in the multiplication of Buddhist centers in Switzerland. Tibetan Geshe Rabten founded in 1977, in Mont Pèlerin, a Buddhist monastery and study centre for European monks, nuns and lay people as well. Switzerland also has Tibetan-Buddhist and Zen monasteries, among them the Tibet Institute Rikon located in Zell-Rikon im Tösstal in the Töss Valley in the canton of Zürich.

In 2003 the Theravada temple Wat Srinagarindravararam in Gretzenbach was dedicated by Princess Galyani Vadhana, the daughter of the Princess Mother Srinagarindra, after whom the temple was named.

In earlier censuses, Buddhism figured together with other non-Abrahamic traditions (mainly Hinduism) as "other churches and communities". These accounted for 0.12% in 1970, 0.19% in 1980, 0.42% in 1990 and 0.78% in 2000 (0.38% Hinduism, 0.29% Buddhism, 0.11% other).

== See also ==
- Nyanatiloka Mahathera
- Wat Srinagarindravararam
- Santacittarama, Italy
- Buddhism in Germany
- Buddhism in France
- Buddhism in Italy
- Buddhism in Iceland
- Religion in Switzerland
- Tibetan Swiss
