= Rikon (disambiguation) =

- Rikon (離婚?) is a 1952 black and white Japanese film directed by Masahiro Makino.
- Rikon ZH is a village of the municipality Zell ZH in the canton of Zürich in Switzerland.
- Tibet Institute Rikon is a Tibetan monastery in Zell-Rikon.
