= Tibetan Swiss =

Ethnic group in Switzerland

Swiss Tibetan
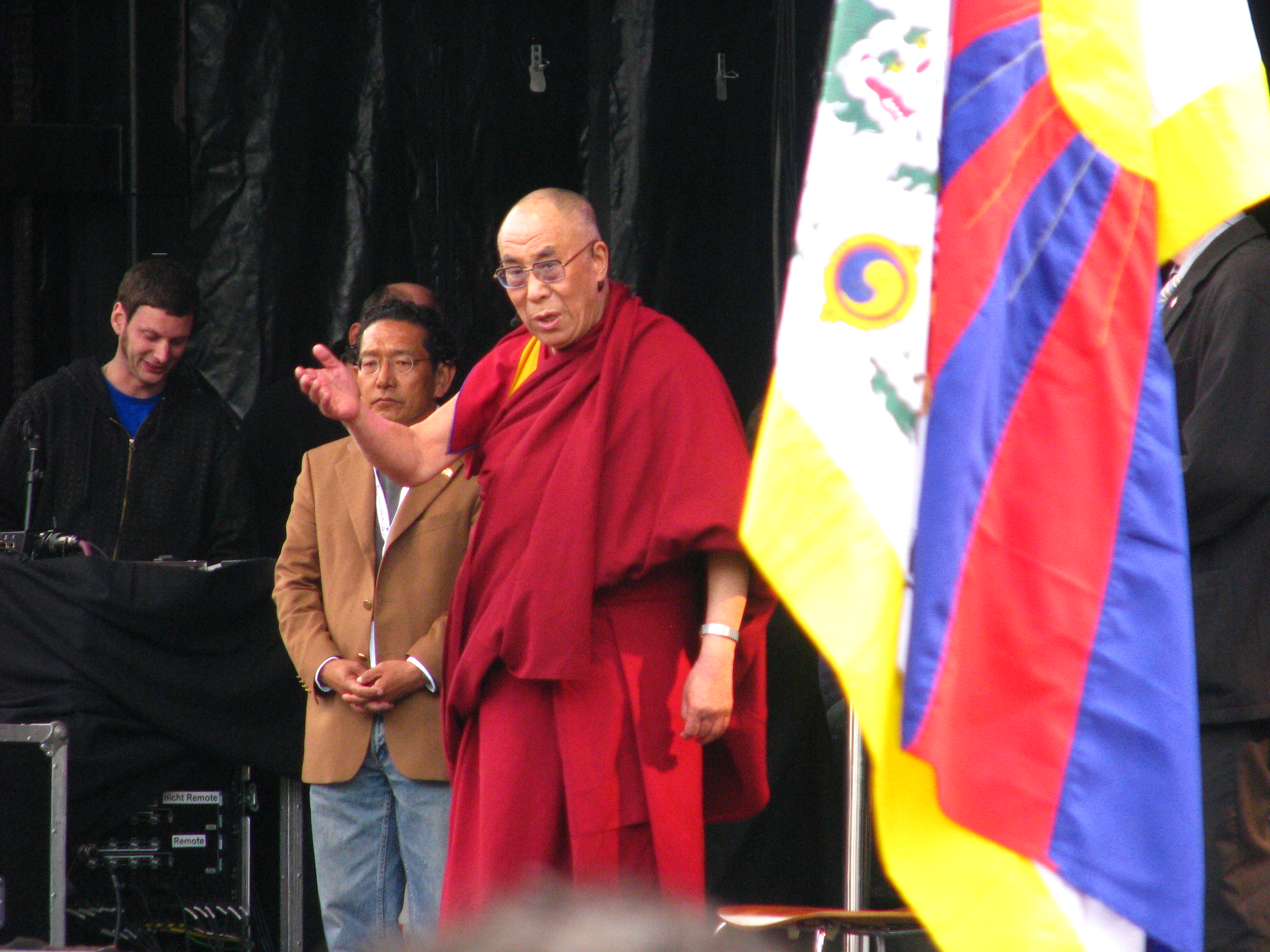

Total population
- 8,000+

Regions with significant populations
- Zurich, Geneva

Languages
- Tibetan, Chinese, German, French, Italian, English

Religion
- Buddhism

Related ethnic groups
- Tibetans

Tibetans in Switzerland (German: Tibeter in der Schweiz; Standard Tibetan: སུའེ་ཙེར་གྱི་བོད་རིགས་) are people of Tibetan origin or descent living in Switzerland. The Tibetan community in Switzerland began forming in the early 1960s and is now the largest Tibetan diaspora group in Europe.

A number of Tibetans settled in the mountains of the Swiss Alps, as the terrain there is similar to that of their homeland on the Tibetan Plateau. Initially, Tibetan children faced difficulties in school due to the significant language barrier between German and Tibetan, but the Tibetans were soon able to gain enough fluency in German to join regular Swiss classes. Some Swiss people also learned basic Tibetan. In 1968, the Tibet Institute Rikon was established in the village of Rikon im Tössal. It is the only Tibetan monastery in Switzerland.

== History ==
In the early 1960s, Switzerland began accepting Tibetan refugees. Following the 1959 Tibetan uprising and the Dalai Lama’s flight into exile, public sympathy for Tibetans was strong in Switzerland, which defended its decision to resettle refugees by citing its humanitarian tradition in response to Chinese objections. In 1963, the Federal Council approved a request to admit 1,000 Tibetan refugees. The Swiss Red Cross and industrialist Charles Aeschimann helped with the resettlement. This included the arrival of 23 refugees from Nepal and placing children with Swiss foster families. This aspect of the program later became a subject of public and historical debate.

In 2015, the Dalai Lama defended the controversial fostering of Tibetan children by Swiss families in the 1960s. The program, arranged in agreement with the Dalai Lama, resettled around 200 children in Swiss foster homes or the Pestalozzi Children’s Village, although later reports revealed that only 19 were orphans. The Dalai Lama stated the children had been in desperate circumstances and needed care.

By 2022, Switzerland had become home to the largest Tibetan community in Europe, according to the Swiss National Museum.

In 2025, a Swiss government-commissioned study conducted by researchers at the University of Basel found that members of the Tibetan and Uyghur communities in Switzerland had been subject to surveillance and pressure by agents of the Chinese government. The report described cases of threatening phone calls, pressure to spy on fellow exiles, and references to relatives in China. It also said that these actions increased mistrust and fear within the communities. According to Swissinfo, the Swiss government said it would raise the findings in its human rights talks with China. Some critics have described these talks as largely symbolic.

== See also ==
- Eisenvogel
- Tibetan American
- Tibet
- Tibetan people
- China–Switzerland relations
