= Wat Srinagarindravararam =

Buddhist temple in Gretzenbach, Switzerland

- วัดศรีนครินทรวราราม
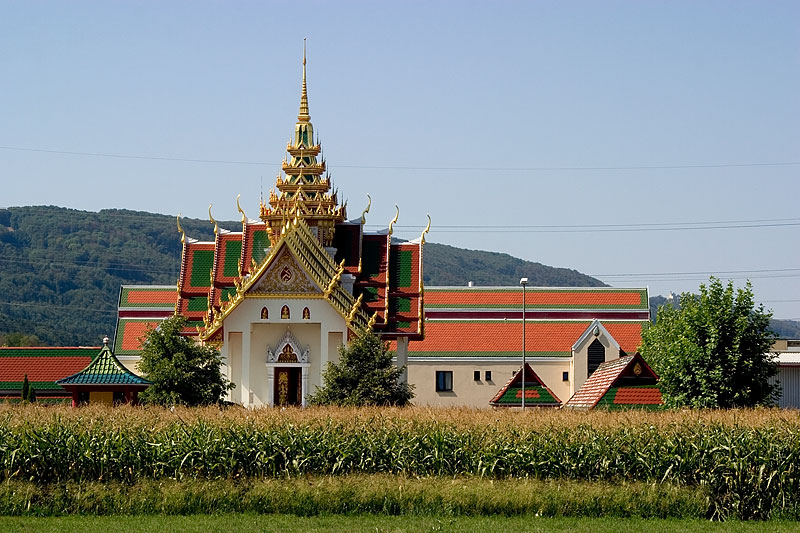
- Wat Srinagarindravararam main hall

- Location within Switzerland

Religion
- Affiliation: Theravada Buddhism

Location
- Location: Im Grund 7, 5014, Gretzenbach
- Country: Switzerland
- Interactive map of Wat Srinagarindravararam
- Coordinates: 47.3584812°N 7.9500685°E

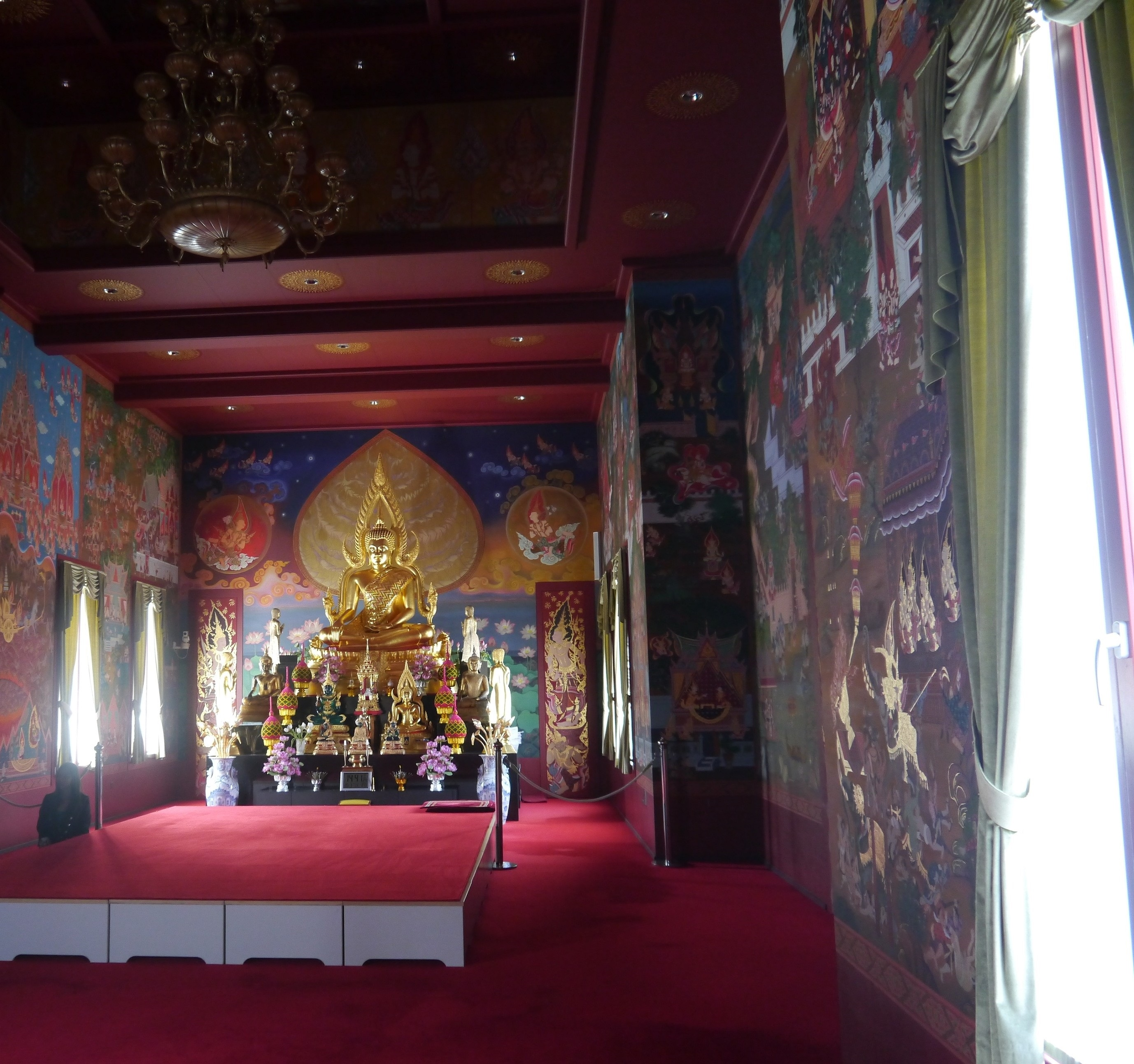
Interior of the main hall

Wat Srinagarindravararam (Thai: วัดศรีนครินทรวราราม) is a Theravada Buddhist temple in Gretzenbach, Switzerland. The temple serves the spiritual needs of the local Thai, Khmer, Lao and Swiss Buddhist community and also as a centre of learning.

== History ==
The relationship between Switzerland and the Thai royal house go back to the time before the Second World War, when the princess and her family lived in Lausanne.

It is named in honour of the Princess Srinagarindra, the mother of King Rama IX, who gave her personal permission for the temple to be named after her. It was dedicated in 2003 by Princess Galyani Vadhana, the daughter of the Princess Mother and sister of the king. The royal family provided financial support for the construction of the temple.
