= Kuhn Rikon =

Swiss cookware manufacturer

Kuhn Rikon AG
- Company type: Aktiengesellschaft
- Industry: Cookware
- Predecessor: Heinrich Kuhn Metallwarenfabrik
- Founded: 1819; 207 years ago
- Founder: Heinrich Kuhn-Boller
- Headquarters: Rikon im Tösstal, canton of Zürich, Switzerland
- Key people: Dorothee Auwärter (Chairwoman)
- Number of employees: 160 (2009)
- Website: www.kuhnrikon.com

Kuhn Rikon is a Swiss cookware manufacturer based in Rikon im Tösstal, Zürich, Switzerland. It is particularly known for pressure cookers sold under the brand name Duromatic, which is often used in Switzerland as a synonym for pressure cooker. The company is a family owned public limited company.

The name Kuhn Rikon is also associated with the Tibet Institute Rikon, which was established by the co-founders of the business as a non-profit spiritual and cultural center for the exiled Tibetans in Switzerland.

== History ==
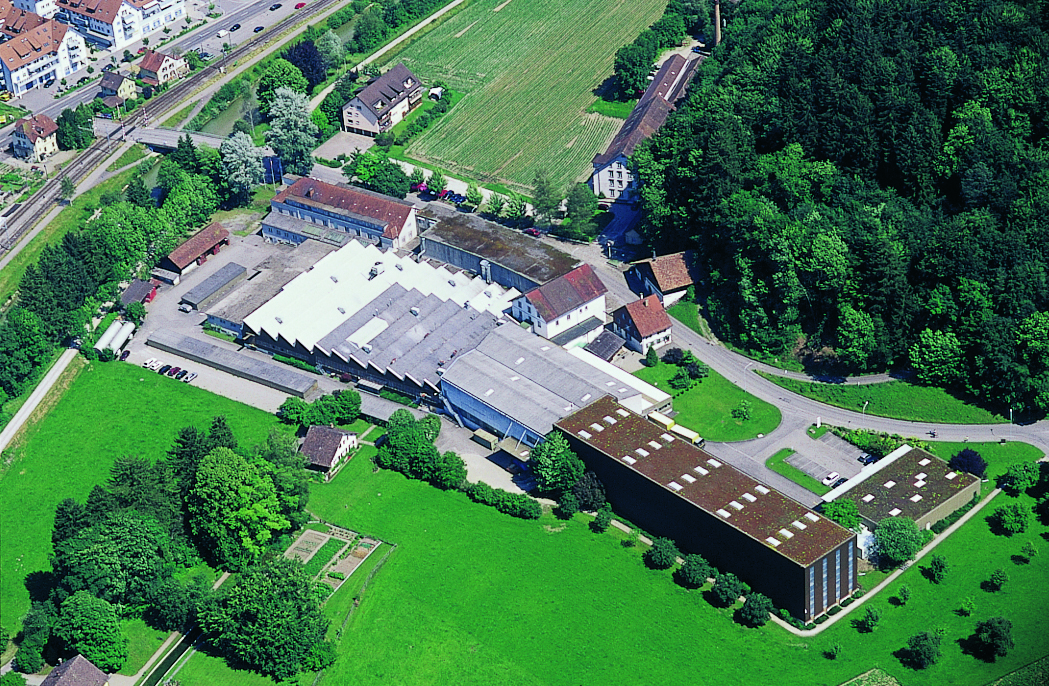
Headquarters in Rikon

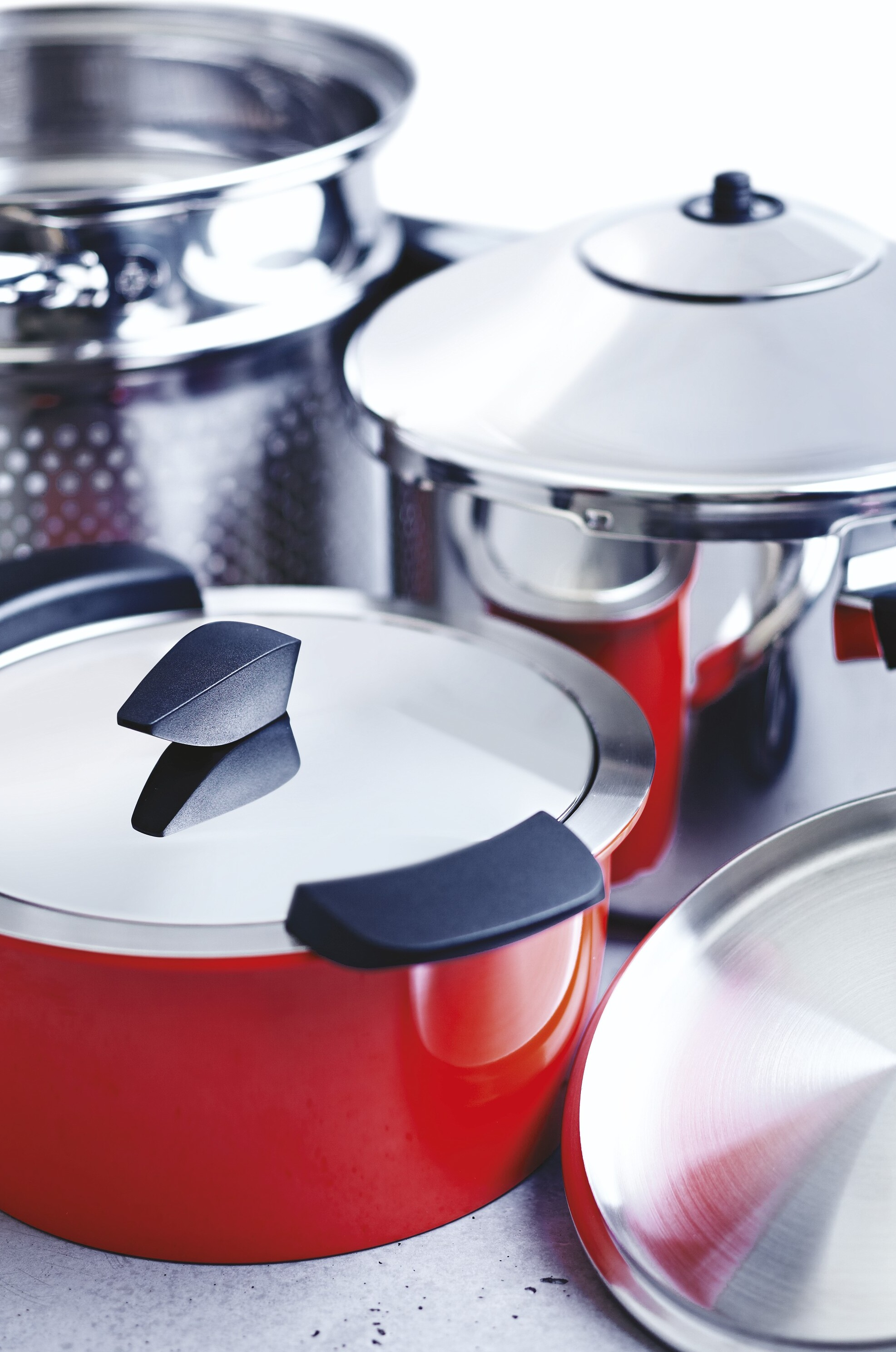
Range of products of Kuhn Rikon

In 1926, Heinrich Kuhn-Boller acquired the bankrupt copper and steel manufacturer Kindlimann and founded the Heinrich Kuhn Metallwarenfabrik. He developed the cookware brand Duro, which was designed for the emerging electric stoves, with flat rather than curved bottoms.

When Heinrich Kuhn died in 1932 as a result of a brain tumour operation, Henri Kuhn took over the management and transformed the business into a share limited company (Aktiengesellschaft). From 1947 his younger brother Jacques Kuhn worked as the technical director and introduced the production line. In 1949 they released the Duromatic pressure cooker which laid the basis for export activities, becoming the market leader.

In 1964 when Switzerland took in 1,000 Tibetan refugees, Henri and Jacques Kuhn provided them with jobs and company housing. In 1967, on the advice of the Dalai Lama, they founded the Tibet Institute Rikon with an endowment of 100,000 francs and land for building. The institute was inaugurated in 1968 and has become a major religious centre for Tibetans in Switzerland and neighbouring countries. Even now, many employees of Kuhn Rikon are of Tibetan descent.

Henri Kuhn died unexpectedly in 1969, but in 1976 his son Hans-Heinrich Kuhn joined the family business, as the third generation. This phase also coincided with the launch of the world's first double-walled cookware (Durotherm), which was patented worldwide and boosted international expansion. In 1984, Jacques Kuhn retired from the company.

In 2001 the company changed its name from Heinrich Kuhn Metallwarenfabrik to its present name Kuhn Rikon AG.

In 2006 Kuhn Rikon opened a museum on the history of cooking.

In 2010 they launched a range of cheese and meat fondue pots, portable stoves and forks, co-developed by Kuhn Rikon and ceramic expert Hanspeter Landert.

In 2012 Philipp Kuhn, Dorothee Auwärter, Christian Kuhn and Willi Auwärter became the fourth generation of family owners, joining the Board of Directors. In April 2014, Dorothee Auwärter took over the company presidency as Chairwoman.

== Criticism ==
In 2007 the Coop offered promotional kitchen appliances under the label Kuhn Rikon, which were not manufactured by Kuhn Rikon, but were produced in China on license.

Based on a report from the Kassensturz TV show, Kuhn Rikon confirmed that there were 140 known cases of exploded double-walled pans of the Durotherm brand by 2009, with 14 cases of injury. Kuhn Rikon stressed that this was not due to production errors, but to improper use, e.g. damage caused by dropping. In cases of uncertain damage after a fall, Kuhn Rikon recommends testing the appliance and carries out tests for customers free of charge.
