= China–Switzerland relations =

- China: Switzerland

Relations between the Republic of China and Switzerland officially began in 1918. On 17 January 1950, Switzerland recognized the People's Republic of China (PRC). Official diplomatic relations began on 14 September 1950.

In the 21st century, economic relations between the two nations grew substantially, with a trade agreement signed in 2014, although relations became somewhat strained around 2020 due to Swiss criticism of China's persecution of the Uyghurs and the 2020 Hong Kong national security law. However, in 2024 relations became warmer again, with China adding Switzerland to the list of European countries whose citizens enjoy visa-free access for tourist travel. This was followed by a launch of negotiations regarding an updated free trade agreement, which were previously delayed by Swiss concerns about human rights in China. In 2026, the countries upgraded their trade agreement.

== History ==
Among the first Swiss visitors to China were Jesuit missionaries in the 17th century. Their watches were popular with the Qing court and as a result a few Swiss watchmakers began exporting watches to China. However, it was only with the popularity of chinoiserie in the 18th century that economic interest in China spread in Switzerland.

In the 19th century, Swiss merchants and missionaries profited from informal imperialism in Switzerland and enjoyed the consular protection of other powers. Although the Swiss media tended to be critical of Western imperialism in China, even during the Boxer Rebellion and the Chinese Communist Party victory in the Chinese Civil War in 1949, most newspapers ignored Swiss involvement in it. With the establishment of diplomatic relations between Switzerland and the Republic of China in 1918, Swiss citizens were officially entitled to extraterritoriality and they formed part of the foreign community in the Chinese treaty ports, enjoying the same privileges as citizens of the imperial powers in China. Swiss exports to China included pocket and wrist watches, indigo, and textiles, while imports from China were dominated by silk and foodstuffs. After World War II, Swiss criticism of the Nationalist government increased. Switzerland relinquished extraterritorial privileges in 1946 but relations between the two nations were distant, and Switzerland was more interested in protecting its economic interests in China than in supporting the Nationalists in the Chinese Civil War. As a result, the Swiss government was the sixth Western nation to recognize the PRC on 17 January 1950.

== Bilateral relations ==
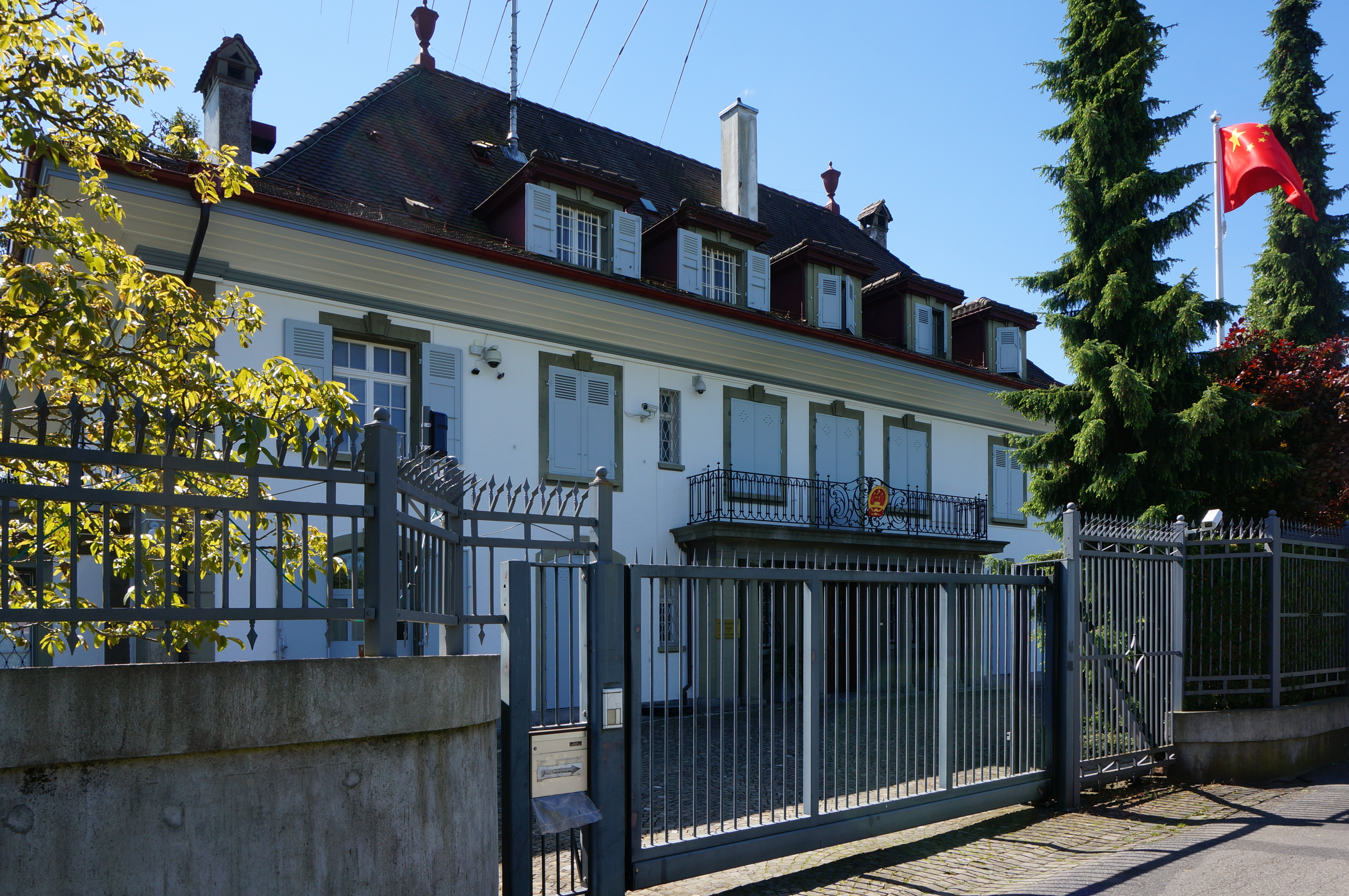
The embassy of China in Bern. In 1954, China opened a Consulate-General in Geneva.

Until China established diplomatic relations with France in 1964, Switzerland was the only country in central and southern Europe to have a Chinese Embassy. As a result, the PRC's Embassy in Bern and the Consulate in Geneva were in charge of China's political, cultural and economic relations with France, Italy, West Germany, and many other European countries. China-Swiss economic relations have accelerated since Deng Xiaoping's reform and opening up in the late 1970s. China's first industrial joint venture was with the Swiss company Schindler in 1980. Switzerland's trade with China is not in deficit as other industrialized nations trade with China. Two way trade between the two countries is growing at an annual rate of 20–30 percent. In 2007, Swiss exports were valued at 5.4 billion Swiss francs or 5.36 billion US dollars. The same year, China was already Switzerland's top trading partner in Asia, ahead of Japan.

Swiss firms have been investing in China substantially over the last decade. There are approximately 300 Swiss firms with more than 700 branches operating in China with a total employment of 55,000 people. Chinese firms have a small but growing presence in Switzerland as a base to expand in Europe. Chinese firms are not only entering markets for basic consumer goods such as textiles and shoes but also for chemical intermediates, pharmaceuticals, high technology parts, and telecommunications.

China and Switzerland signed a free trade agreement in 2013. Direct exports from Switzerland to China accounted for 22.8 billion in that deal, which was heralded as a "real milestone" by then Swiss President Ueli Maurer. Switzerland has a positive trade balance with China, and both countries are expected to profit from export guarantees, protection of intellectual property and financial cooperation between their largest banks. Switzerland thus became the first continental European country and the largest economy to conclude a free trade deal with China.

In January 2015, during the World Economic Forum, the Swiss National Bank and the People's Bank of China signed a memorandum of understanding on the establishment of renminbi clearing arrangements in Switzerland.

=== 2020 ===
In June 2020, Switzerland openly opposed the Hong Kong national security law.

In September 2020, the Swiss Federal Intelligence Service wrote that:

The gap between the Western liberal model and China's authoritarian state capitalism will widen further. Despite the fact that China's threat to the world had not been visible in Switzerland, reports on the administration's disinformation campaigns, censorship and political repression of its opponents in Hong Kong and ethnic minorities in Tibet and Xinjiang marked the growing international perception of the threat posed by China.

In October 2020, Switzerland signed a joint statement on the human rights situation in Xinjiang and the recent developments in Hong Kong, delivered by Germany and denouncing China.

=== 2021 ===
In 2021, the Federal Department of Foreign Affairs (FDFA) ascertained the rapid development of the Chinese economy, and concurrently the number of businesses in Switzerland that maintain contact with China was also rising. Switzerland had advocated "a balanced, coherent and coordinated approach to China", according to the federal department. Switzerland has a long history of close cooperation with the People's Republic of China (PRC). In 1950, Switzerland was one of the first European states to recognize the PRC. The newly drafted China Strategy 2021–24 was a pragmatic process that involved all departments of the Federal Administration. China and Switzerland had signed a free trade agreement in 2013 to further strengthen bilateral relations, particularly in key sectors, including green tech.

=== 2022 ===
A 2022 Swiss business in China survey analyzed the key challenges for Swiss enterprises there. The survey found that business relations between the two nations were "at their highest ever levels on the back of high profit and re-venue growth expectations for 2022". The broad optimism for economic cooperation was illustrated by the full recovery of the growth lost due to the COVID-19 pandemic, yet within 6 months, Swiss business confidence went from its highest recorded level to its lowest, similar to the 2015 Chinese stock market crash and the lifting of the Swiss peg to the Euro.

In 2022, Switzerland called on China to close the Xinjiang re-education camps where at least one million ethnic minority Uyghurs were reportedly being held.

=== 2023 ===
Since 2010, China had been Switzerland's largest business partner in Asia, and its third largest globally. According to the State Secretariat for Economic Affairs (SECO) Swiss business activity in China was expanding with the implementation of the stock connect program. Despite Washington's demands to review audit records, which Beijing resisted on national security grounds, and "the risks of Chinese companies failing to meet the expected corporate governance standards", Swiss economic relations with China were at their highest level, including with lithium battery producers, electronics and medical device makers. In June 2023, the demand for Swiss watches in China appeared also in a significant upward trend, contributing to increased export volumes of Swiss watches overall. In the high technology sector, Swiss aerospace companies and academic institutions increased their cooperation with Chinese space exploration in connection with the International Lunar Research Station (ILRS).

In 2023, Swiss authorities raided a Chinese-owned hotel in Unterbäch suspected of operating a spy ring directed at a nearby airfield hosting Lockheed Martin F-35 Lightning II jets.

=== 2024 ===
In 2024, Chinese Premier Li Qiang conducted a state visit to Switzerland by in January, where he was greeted by Swiss President Viola Amherd. In the aftermath of this meeting, Switzerland became one of the few European countries whose citizens are granted visa-free tourist travel to mainland China for up to 15 days. In July 2024, it was announced that China and Switzerland signed a memorandum of understanding to officially start negotiations for upgrading their existing free trade agreement (FTA). This move aims to enhance the quality of bilateral economic cooperation and comes after discussions between high-ranking officials from both countries. As Swiss daily Tages-Anzeiger reports, the PRC is seeking easier temporary movement of Chinese service providers to Switzerland through temporary work permits. However, Swiss negotiators are bound by Switzerland's national laws and quotas on immigration, limiting their flexibility in this area. Additionally, China wants to increase agricultural exports to Switzerland, but the Swiss government places a high value on protecting its domestic agricultural sector. On the other hand, the Chinese side is prepared to make concessions by negotiating clauses on addressing climate change and worker's rights. The latter involves the application of standards from the International Labor Organization (ILO), to which China has committed itself.

=== 2025 ===
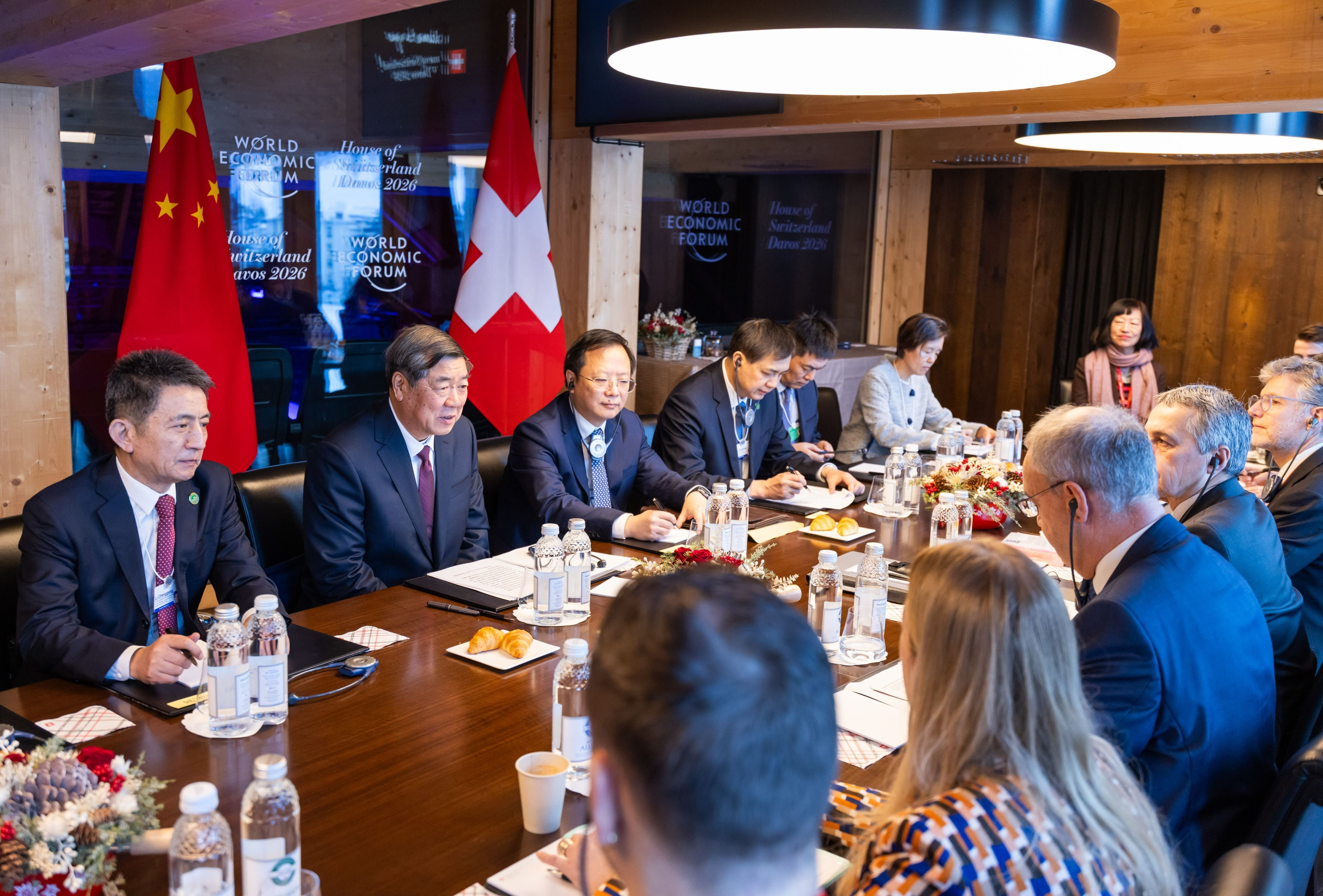
Swiss President Guy Parmelin with Chinese Vice Premier He Lifeng at the 56th World Economic Forum in Davos on 20 January 2026

In February 2025, the Swiss government released a report alleging that the government of the People's Republic of China pressures Uyghurs and Tibetans in Switzerland to spy on their communities.

=== 2026 ===
In October 2026, Swiss President Guy Parmelin visited China, where he met with Chinese leader Xi Jinping. During the meeting, they upgraded a trade deal signed between the two countries signed in 2014.

== Economic ties ==
A 'stock connect program' was approved in late July 2022 by Chinese and Swiss regulators. More than 10 Chinese companies will have access to the SIX Swiss Exchange through global depositary receipts (GDRs). In 2022, the companies already raised about $1.5 billion for mainland China.

== See also ==
- Diplomatic Documents of Switzerland
- List of diplomatic missions in Switzerland

== Bibliography ==
- Switzerland China 75 Years in 75 Objects, published by the Embassy of Switzerland in China, 2025.
