= List of Tibetan monasteries =

This is the list of Tibetan monasteries of Tibetan Buddhism.

Name	Location	Tradition	Established	Destroyed	Note
Alchi	Ladakh	Gelug	11th century		
Badekar Monastery	Bugat, Inner Mongolia Autonomous Region	Gelug	1749		
Chagri Monastery	Bhutan	Kagyu	1620		
Chaksam Cho Ri	Chushul, U-Tsang		14th century	Destroyed in 1959	from Chaksam Bridge diagram made in 1878
Densatil	Southeast of Lhasa near the Yarlung Tsangpo	Kagyu	1198	1960s	
Dorje Drak	Lhoka	Nyingma	1400, 1720, 1960s in India	1717, 1960s	One of the six "Nyingmapa mother monasteries."
Drepung	Lhasa	Gelug	1416		Home monastery of the Dalai Lama and founded by Jamyang Choje. Drepung was historically the largest monastery in Tibet as well as the largest in the world until the annexation of Tibet by the People's Republic of China
Drigung	Lhasa Prefecture	Kagyu	1179, 1980s	1960s	
Drongtse Monastery	Tsang	Gelug			
Dzogchen	Kham	Nyingma	1684		One of the six "Nyingmapa mother monasteries."
Ganden	Lhasa Prefecture	Gelug	1409	1959, 1966	Seat of the Ganden Tripa. Founded by Tsongkhapa in 1409.
Gonchen Monastery	Kham	Sakya	1729		
Gongkar Chöde	Lhokha	Sakya	1464		
Gyumay and Gyuto Lower and Upper Tantric Colleges	Tsang	Gelug	1433 and 1475		
Hemis	Ladakh	Drukpa	1672		
Jokhang Temple	Lhasa	Gelug	652	Severely Damaged by People's Liberation Army in March, 1959	Lhasa main temple. Said to have been built by King Songtsen Gampo in 647; a major pilgrimage site.
Jonang Phuntsokling Monastery	Tsang	Jonang	14th century		
Kardang	Lahaul	Drukpa	12th century		Main monastery in Lahaul.
Karma Gön Monastery	Kham	Kagyu	1147		Seat of the 1st to the 7th Tai Situpa
Katok	Garze	Nyingma	1159		One of the six "Nyingmapa mother monasteries".
Keru Temple	Ü	Nyingma	mid-8th century		
Key Monastery	Lahaul and Spiti district, Himachal Pradesh	Gelugpa	11th century		
Kharchu Monastery	Lhokha	Nyingma	16th century		
Khomthing Monastery	Lhokha				
Khorshak Temple	Western Tibet				
Kirti Gompa	Amdo	Gelug	1472		
Kumbum Monastery	Amdo	Gelug	1583		
Labrang Monastery	Amdo	Gelug	1709		Was founded in 1709 by the first Jamyang Zhaypa, Ngawang Tsondru.
Lhuntse Dzong	Bhutan	Nyingma	1654		The 14th Dalai Lama arrived at Lhuntse Dzong on 26 March 1959, on his way to exile in India.
Magur Namgyal Ling	Amdo	Gelug	1646		
Menri	Ü	Bön	1405	1386, 1966	
Menri Monastery	Tsang				
Mindrolling	Lhokha	Nyingma			One of the six "Nyingmapa mother monasteries."
Nalendra Monastery	Penpo				
Namdzong Nunnery	Amdo				
Namgyal Monastery	Lhasa				
Nangshi Monastery	Ngaba, Amdo				
Narthang Monastery	Tsang				
Nechung Temple	Lhasa				
Ngor Temple	Ü	Sakya	1429	1959	
Nyethang Drolma Lhakhang Temple	Ü				
Pabonka Hermitage	Lhasa	Gelug	7th century		Independent before 1959, has belonged to Sera since 1980.
Gyantse Palkor Chöde Monastery (Palcho Monastery)	Tsang	Gelug, Sakya, Kadam	1428		
Palpung	Derge	Kagyu	1727		Founded by the 8th Situ Panchen, Seat of the Tai Situpa and Jamgon Kongtrul.
Palyul	Palyul	Nyingma			One of the six "Nyingmapa mother monasteries". Other branch "Namdroling Monastery" established by Penor Rinpoche in India, in 1963
Pemayangtse Monastery	Sikkim	Nyingma	1705		
Pomda Monastery	Baxoi				
Punakha Dzong	Bhutan	Drukpa			Winter home of the Central Monk Body
Ralung Monastery	Tsang				
Ralung		Drukpa			Seat of the Gyalwang Drukpa
Ramoche Temple	Lhasa				
Rato Dratsang	Karnataka	Gelug			Formerly on the outskirts of Lhasa, but now re-established in south India.
Ratö Monastery	Ü				
Reting	Ü	Gelug			
Riwoche	Kham	Kagyu			Seat of the Taklung Kagyu lineage.
Rongbuk	Basum Township	Nyingma	1902		
Rongwo Gönchen Monastery	Amdo				
Rumtek Monastery	Sikkim	Kagyu	18th century		
Sakya Monastery	Tsang	Sakya			Seat of the Sakya Trizin.
Samye Monastery	Ü		775 - 779		
Samye		Nyingma			First monastery in Tibet, established by Padmasambhava and Shantarakshita. Heinrich Harrer in 1982 flew over "Samye; it was totally destroyed. One can still make out the outer wall, but none of the temples or stupas survives."
Sekhar Guthok Monastery	Lhokha				1950 photo of Sekhar Gutog (sras mkhar dgu thog) monastery in Lhodrag by Hugh Richardson. Founded by Milarepa in the 11th century
Sanga Monastery	Lhokha				
Sera	Lhasa	Gelug			One of the largest monasteries in Tibet, containing numerous colleges. Founded by Chöje Shakya Yeshe. [[:|Photo of smashed statues pieces at Lhasa's Sera Monastery destroyed by the Communist Chinese after 1959 flight of the 14th Dalai Lama to exile in India.]]
Shalu	Tsang	Sakya			
Shechen	Kham	Nyingma			One of the six "Nyingmapa mother monasteries".
Simbiling Monastery	...				
Spituk	Ladakh	Gelug			
Surmang Monastery	Kham	1988			
Surmang			Kagyu		Seat of the Trungpa tülkus.
Tabo	Spiti	Gelug			Largest monastery in Spiti.
Taklung Monastery	Ü				
Taktsang Monastery	Dzoge, Amdo				
Tamzhing Monastery	Bhutan	Nyingma	1501		
Tashichho Dzong	Thimphu	Drukpa			Houses the Central Monk Body in summer.
Tashilhünpo	Tsang	Gelug			Seat of the Panchen Lama. Founded by Gyalwa Gendün Drup.
Tawang Monastery	Tawang District, Arunachal Pradesh	Gelug	1681		The monastery is the second-largest in Asia.
Thikse Monastery	Ladakh	Gelug	15th century		
Tholing Monastery	West Tibet				
Tibet Institute Rikon	Rikon, Switzerland	Nyingma			Since 2007, the monastery comprises representatives of all four great traditions : Nyingma, Kagyu, Sakya and Gelug.
Tingri Monastery	Tsang				
Tradruk Temple	Lhokha	Gelug			The largest and oldest monastery in the Yarlung Valley. Said to have been built by King Songtsen Gampo.
Trathang Monastery	Lhokha				
Tsandan Monastery	Nagchu				
Tsaparang Monastery & Palace Complex	Western Tibet				
Tsethang Monastery	Lhokha				
Tsö Monastery	Amdo				
Tsozong Gongba		Nyingma			
Tsuglagkhang Temple	Dharamshala, Himachal Pradesh				Current residence of the 14th Dalai Lama.
Tsurphu	Ü	Kagyu			Seat of the Gyalwa Karmapa.
Yama Tashikyil	Rebkong, Amdo				
Yarchen Gar		Nyingma	1985		Largest monastery in the world +10000 monks.
Yarlung Sheldrak	U-tsang	Gelug	18th century		"Yarlung Sheldrak is a monastic community that first developed around a Padmasambhava meditation cave, possibly as early as the eighth century. It was converted to the Geluk tradition in the nineteenth century."
Yemar Temple	Tsang				
Yerpa		Gelug	600–700	1959	Famous meditation site of King Songtsen Gampo and Padmasambhava; 300 monks lived here in 1959.
Yonghe Temple	Beijing	Gelug	1700s		National centre of Lama administration during Qing dynasty
Yungdrungling Monastery	Tsang				

== Gallery ==
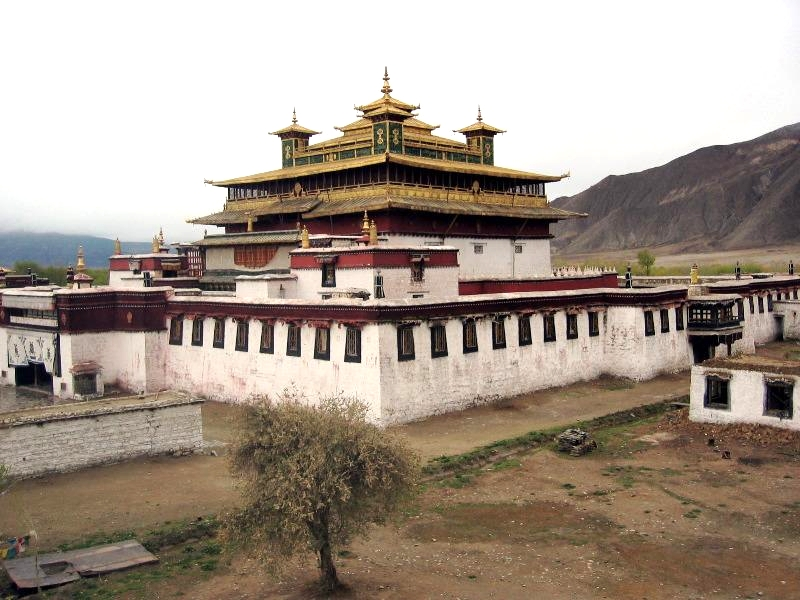
Samye Monastery in Dranang

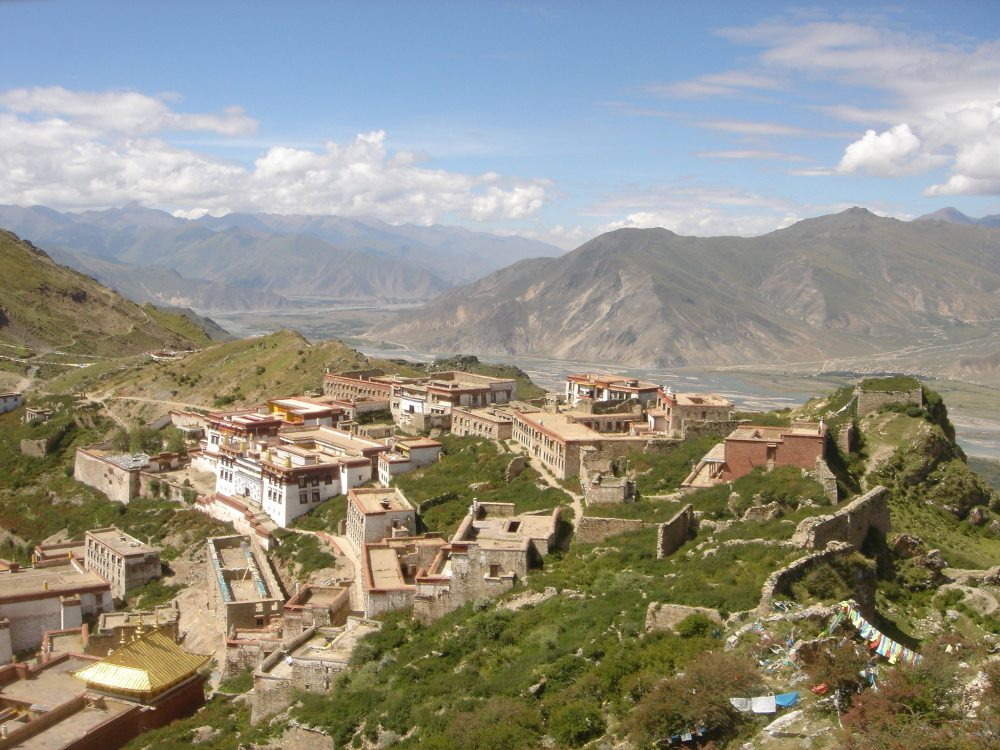
Ganden Monastery in Lhasa with some ruins visible from destruction by the Communist Chinese after 1959 flight of the 14th Dalai Lama to exile in India.

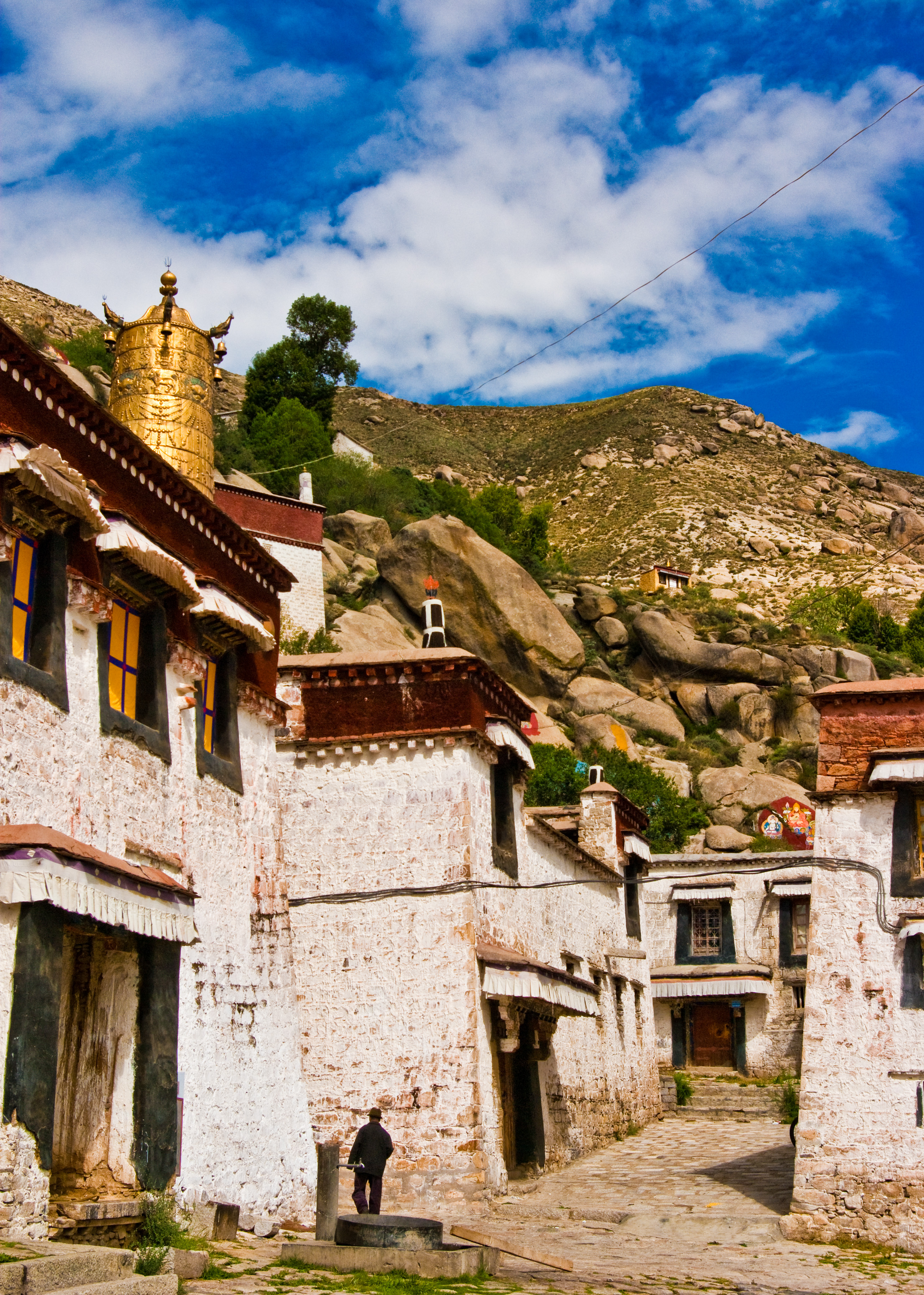
Sera Monastery in Lhasa

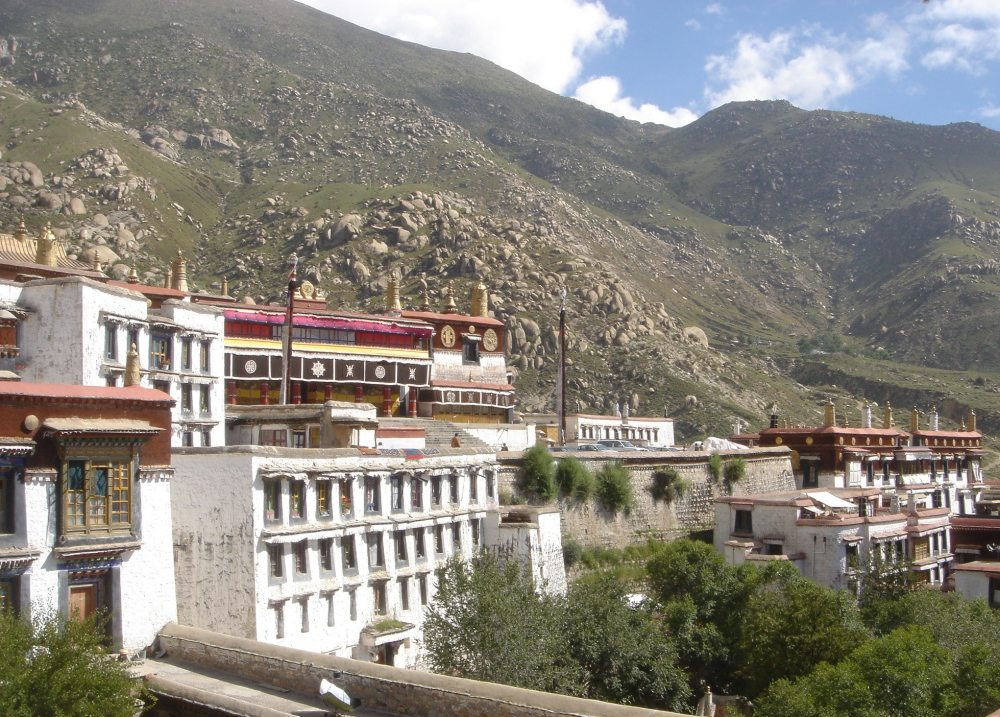
Drepung Monastery in Lhasa

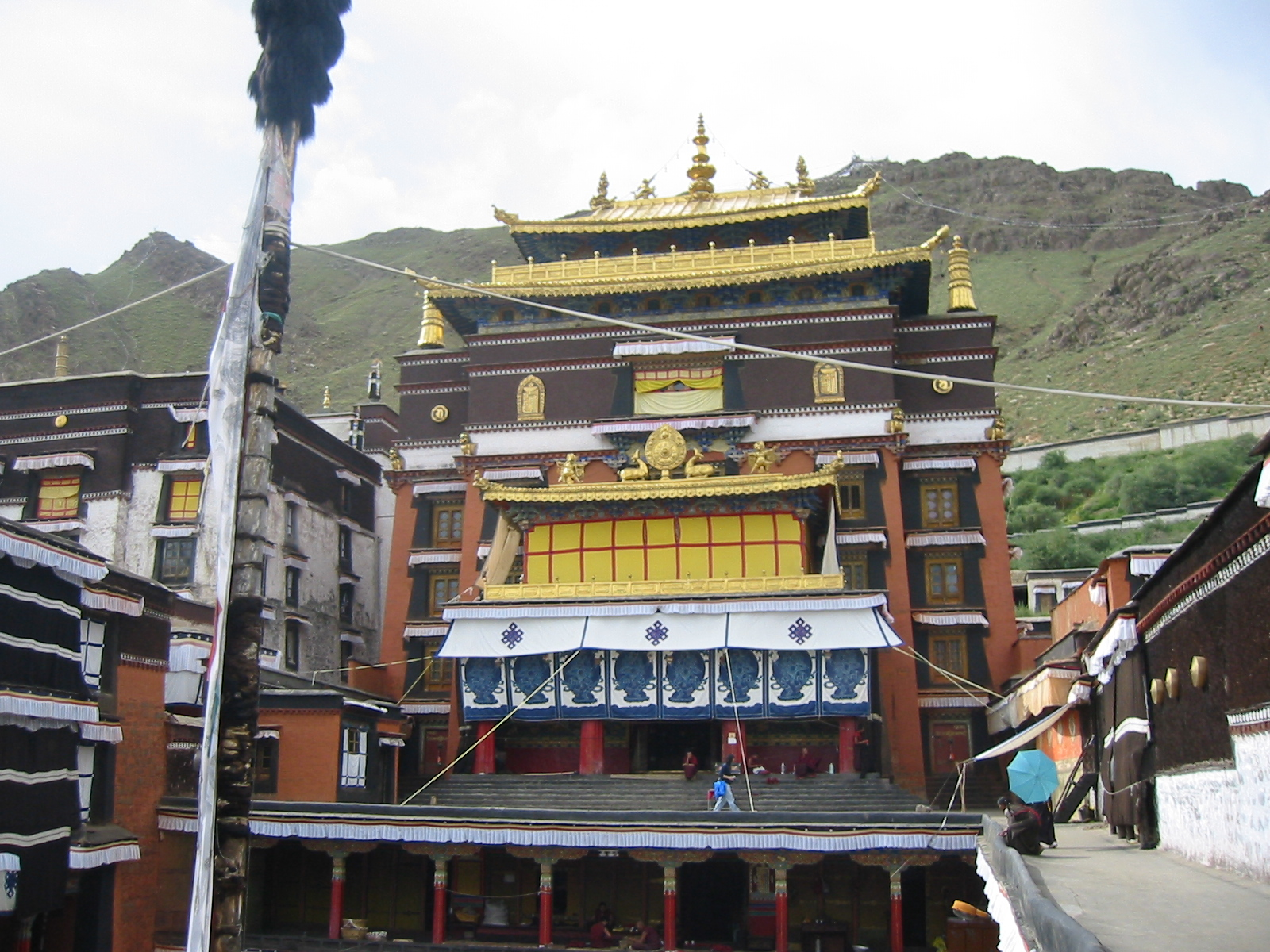
Tashilhunpo in Shigatse

== See also ==
- List Tibetan Buddhist monasteries in Ladakh
- Himalayan monasteries
