= Tibet Institute Rikon =

Tibetan Buddhist monastery in the Töss Valley, Zurich, Switzerland

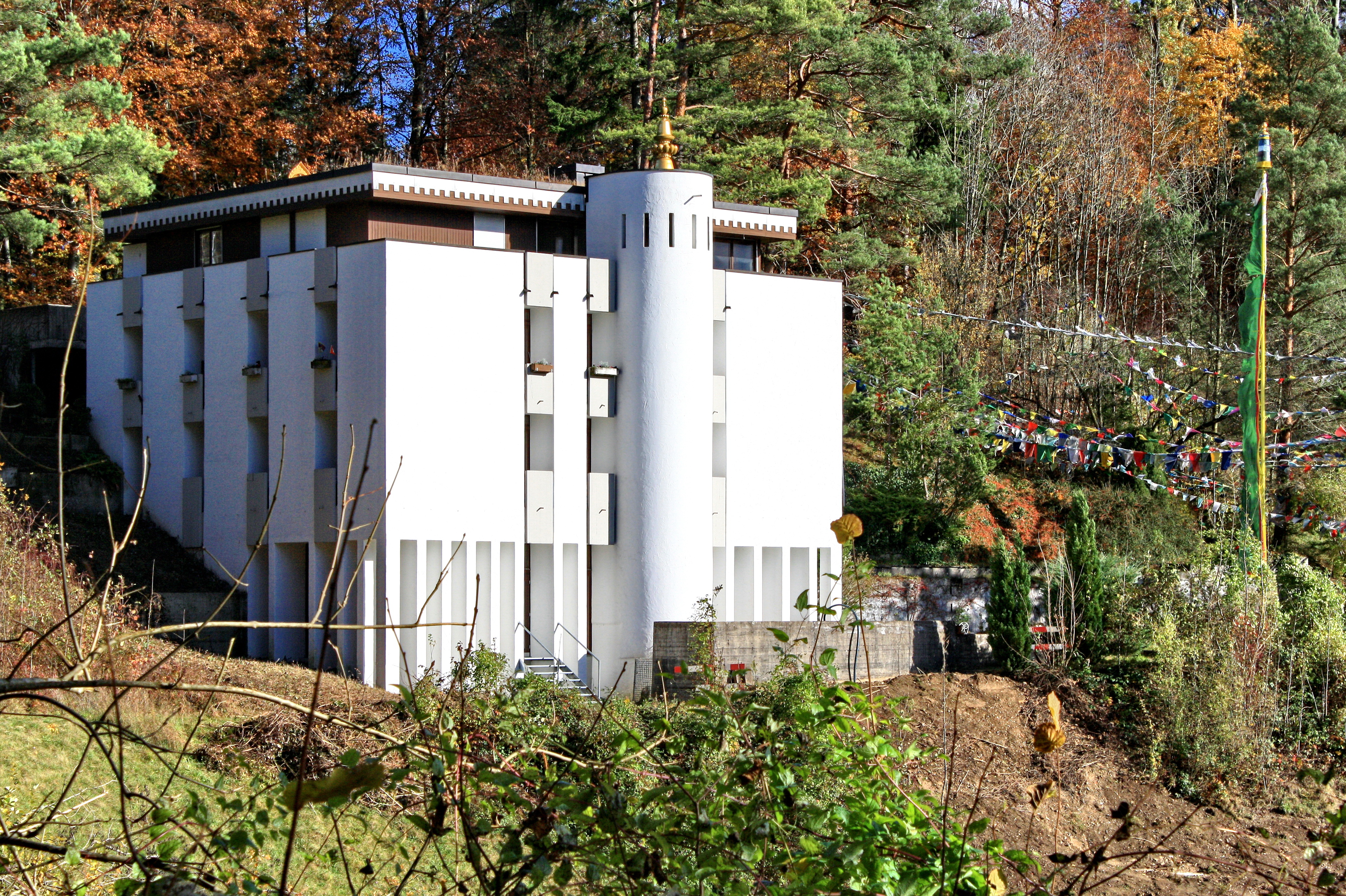
- 47°26′12″N 8°48′10″E
- Location: Zell, Switzerland

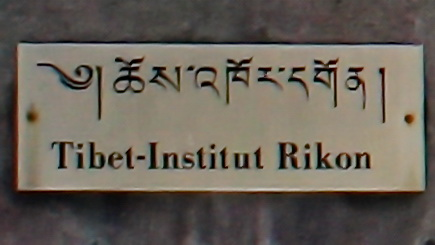
Sign of the Tibet-Institute Rikon

The Tibet Institute Rikon is a Tibetan monastery located in Zell-Rikon im Tösstal in the Töss Valley in Switzerland. It was established as a non-profit foundation in 1968, because Swiss laws resulting from the 19th century secularization movement did not allow for the establishment of new monasteries until 1973.

== History ==
In 1961, Switzerland was one of the first countries in the West that allowed Tibetan refugees to settle in large numbers. Henri and Jacques Kuhn (owner of Metallwarenfabrik AG Heinrich Kuhn, now Kuhn Rikon AG) offered work and accommodations to a group of refugees. They helped found a monastic Tibet Institute for spiritual and cultural care of Tibetan people in Switzerland, which would also preserve and maintain the Tibetan culture for future generations. Jacques Kuhn supported the monastic community until his death in January 2017.

The Tibet-Institut Rikon is the only monastery outside Asia that was founded on behalf of the Dalai Lama. It was inaugurated on 9 November 1968 under the name „Kloster zum Rad der Lehre„ (literally: Monastery for the Wheel of Teaching) - but as a “Monastic Tibet Institute,” as the founding of a monastery was not permitted under the then Swiss federal constitution. The Dalai Lama was also not present at the inauguration: the Federal Council banned him from entering the country. He visited the monastery for the first time in 1973. The monastic community in Rikon claims to be the only Tibetan monastery in the West. The monastic Tibet Institute in Rikon was established according to the advice and under the patronage of the 14th Dalai Lama, who emphasized the importance of monasteries for Tibetan people in exile. The Dalai Lama sent an abbot and four monks to Rikon from India. The institute's buildings were designed by architect Ueli Flück (Baden AG), and the foundation stone was laid on 29 July 1967. On 9 November 1968 the monastic Tibet Institute was consecrated by the Dalai Lama's two principal teachers, Trijang Rinpoche and Ling Rinpoche, under the name "Kloster zum Rad der Lehre" (literally: Monastery for the Wheel of Teaching). On 8 April 2010 the 14th Dalai Lama visited the monastery community in Rikon for the 14th time, and was warmly received by Tibetan people, on the occasion of the 50th anniversary of the establishment of Tibetan refugees in Switzerland. The 14th Dalai Lama visited the monastic community again in 2013, 2015 and 2016.

== Institute's building ==
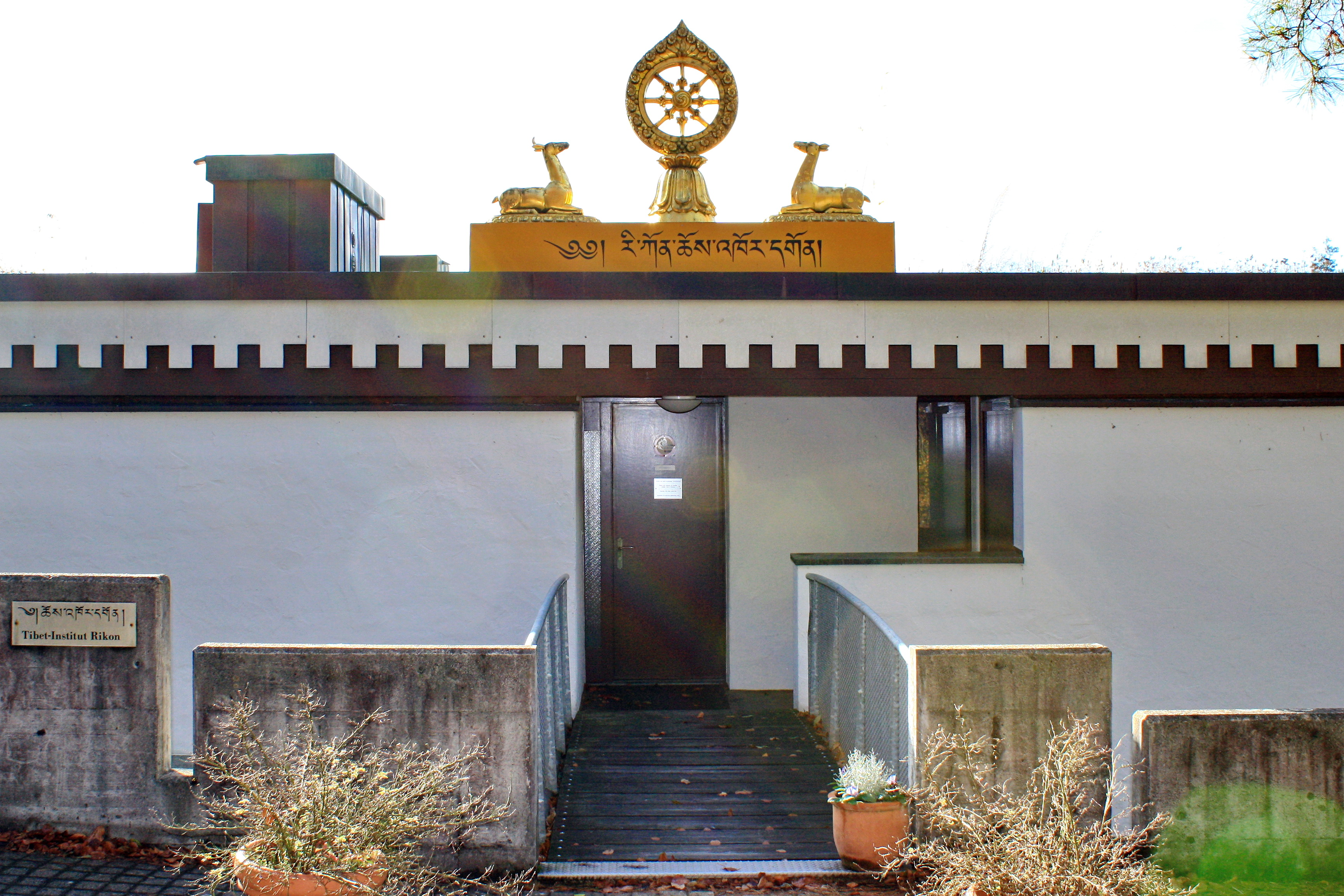
Upper Entrance

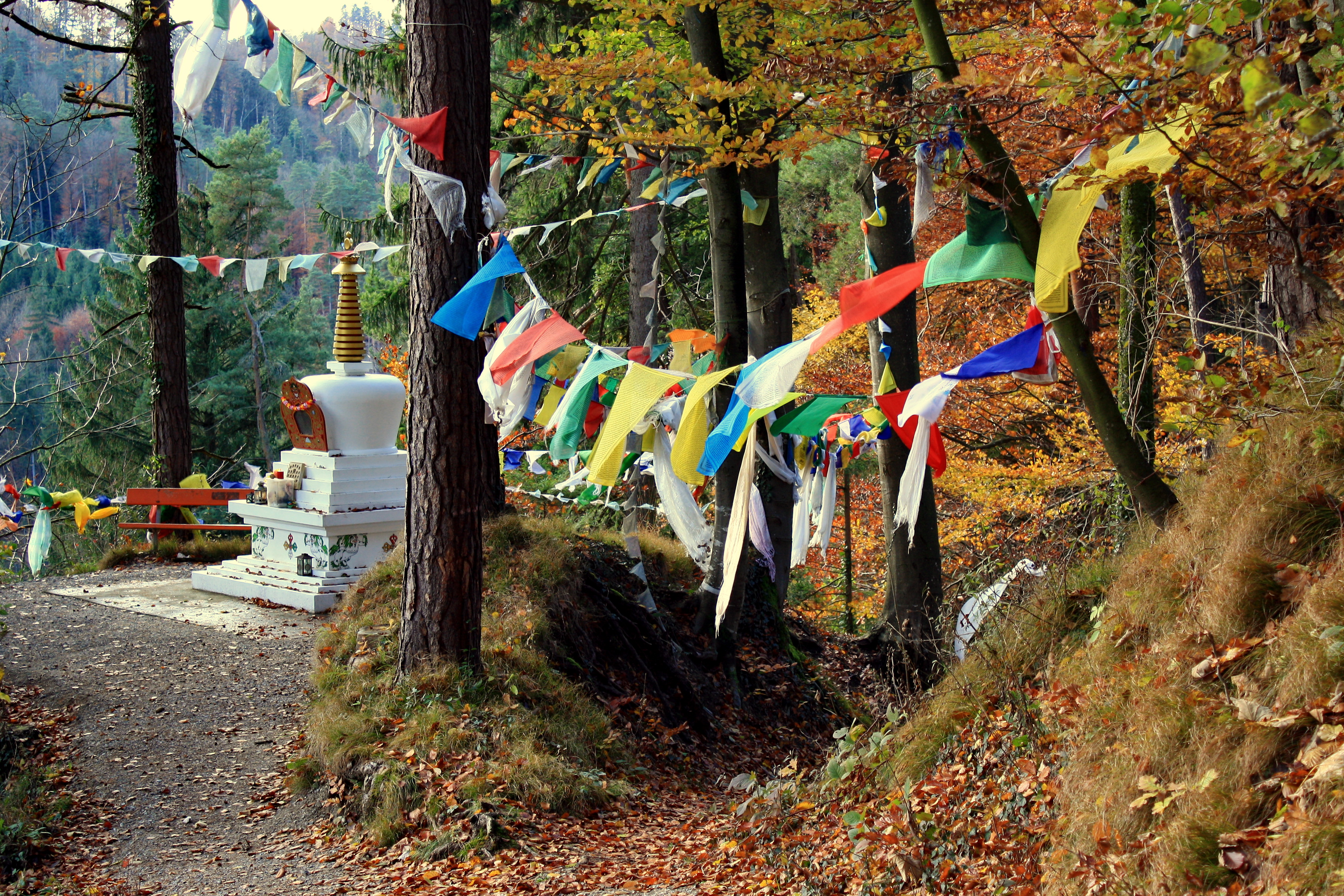
Stupa (Tibetan: Chöten)

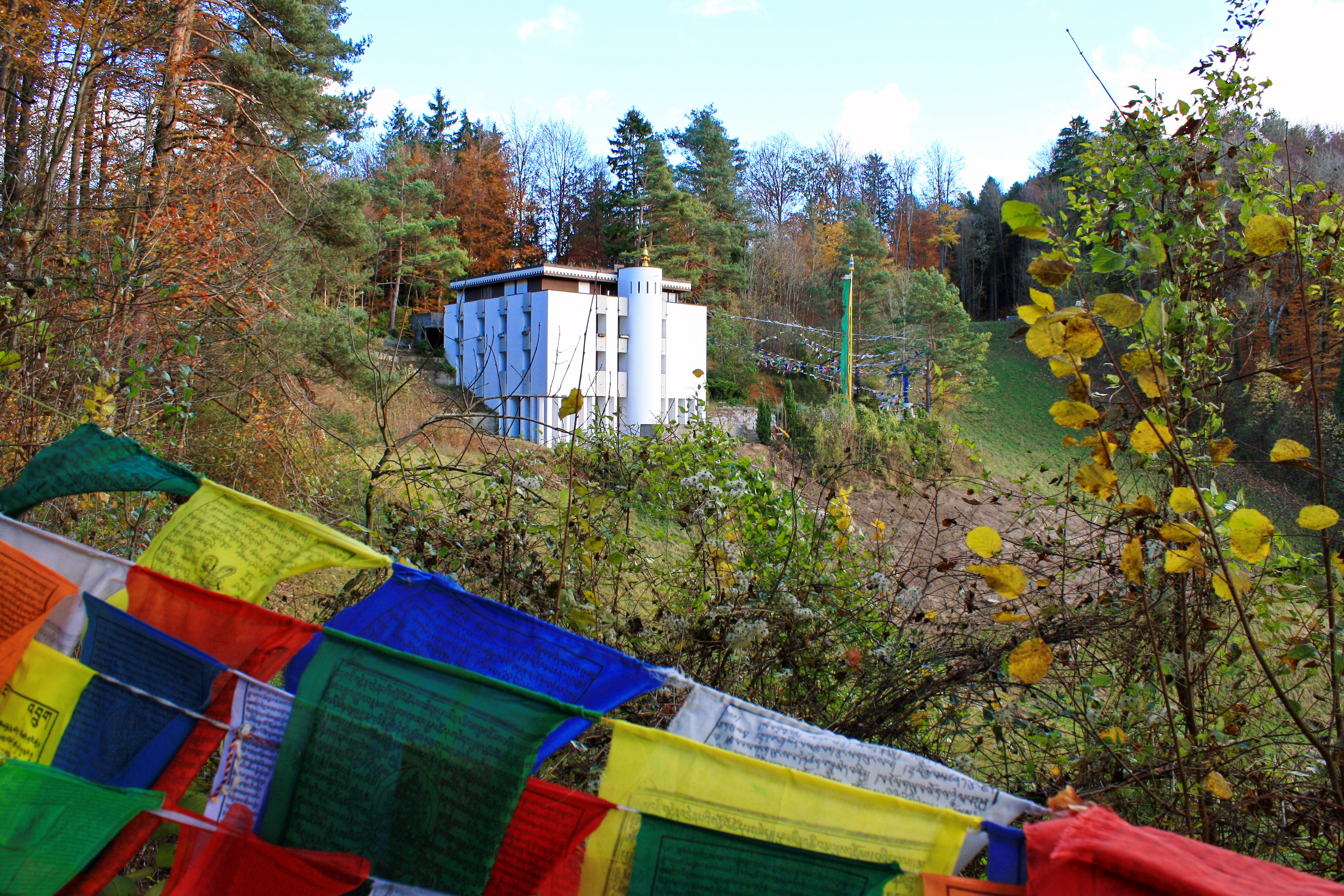
The monastery's buildings and some prayer flags as seen from the Stupa

The Institute building was designed in a functional western style which incorporates traditional Tibetan elements. The overall design was not based on traditional Tibetan sacred architecture, because this would have reflected the altered role of a Tibetan monastery in the West in a misleading manner.

== Cultural and religious life ==
Today the Buddhist monastery and its monastic community is a vital part of the cultural and religious life of Tibetan people in Switzerland. The large variety of cultural activities of the Tibet Institute also provide an important forum for the constantly growing number of Western people interested in Buddhism and Tibet. The institute promotes the understanding of Tibetan culture for both the general public and for specialists. It organizes public events, maintains its own library, issues its own publications, provides support to students and researchers, engages in public relations and outreach, and maintains contacts with related institutions. Its project «Science meets Dharma» provides Tibetan monks and nuns access to western scientific culture.

The Tibet Institute Rikon provides for the spiritual and cultural needs of Tibetans in Switzerland, striving to preserve Tibetan culture and religion for the benefit of future generations of Tibetans. It makes Tibetan culture accessible to interested western and other non-Tibetan people. The monastic community supports scientific research in the field of Tibetology and is promoting dialogue between Buddhist philosophy and western science.

The institute also has a publicly accessible special library. With around 11,000 titles of Tibetan-specific documents, it is one of the world's largest Tibetan specialist libraries. The monastery is supported by a foundation that finances about one third of the annual operating expenses. Two thirds come from patrons and sponsors.

Today there are about 8,000 people with Tibetan roots living in Switzerland. In the 1960s, Switzerland took in over a thousand Tibetan refugees. This was after a popular uprising by the Tibetans against Chinese foreign rule failed in 1959 and the Dalai Lama and thousands of his compatriots fled abroad. Switzerland was the first European country to receive Tibetan refugees. In September 2018 the monastery celebrated its 50th anniversary. Once again the Dalai Lama visited the monastic community, and also a special moment for the Tibetan community in Switzerland.

== Monastic community ==
In 2018 the monastic community in Rikon comprises seven Buddhist monks and the abbot who has been in office since 2011. They represent the four major schools of Tibetan Buddhism. Together with the staff of the institute, they organize events on topics related to Tibetan culture and religion. Also, 20 to 30 school classes visit the monastery every year. In 2009 the monastic community comprised 9 Tibetan monks. Geshe Phuntsok Tashi, the fourth abbot, was appointed by the 14th Dalai Lama in 1996. Since 2007 the monastery has had representatives of all four great traditions of Tibetan Buddhism: Nyingma, Kagyu, Sakya and Gelug.

- Geshe Ugyen Tseten (1st abbot, 1967–1974)
- Geshe Tamdin Rabten (2nd abbot, 1975–1979)
- Geshe Gedün Sangpo (3rd abbot, 1979–1995)
- Geshe Phuntsok Tashi (4th abbot, 1996–2010)
- Geshe Thupten Legmen (5th abbot, since 2011)

== See also ==
- Tibetan Swiss

== Publications ==
- Dahortshang, Champa N. Lodro; Tibetan manuscripts, blockprints and modern editions in the library of the Tibetan Institute at Rikon/Zurich; Rikon 1974 (Tibet-Institut)
- Fürstenberger, Mattias; Schuler, Samuel; Wäger, Lukas; Tibeter in der Schweiz: Kloster Rikon als spirituelles Zentrum; St. Gallen 2004
- Hürsch, Thomas; Lindegger-Stauffer, Peter; Katalog der Sekundärliteratur am Tibet-Institut Rikon/Zürich; Rikon 1973 (Tibet-Institut)
- Kuhn, Jacques; Warum ein tibetisches Kloster in Rikon{?; Rikon 1996 (Tibet-Institut)
- Wangpo Tethong; Der Wandel in der politischen Elite der Tibeter im Exil: Integrations- & Desintegrationsprozesse in der politischen Elite, 1950 bis 1979; 2000 (Tibet Institute Rikon), ISBN 978-3-72060-036-1
