= Rikon im Tösstal =

- Village
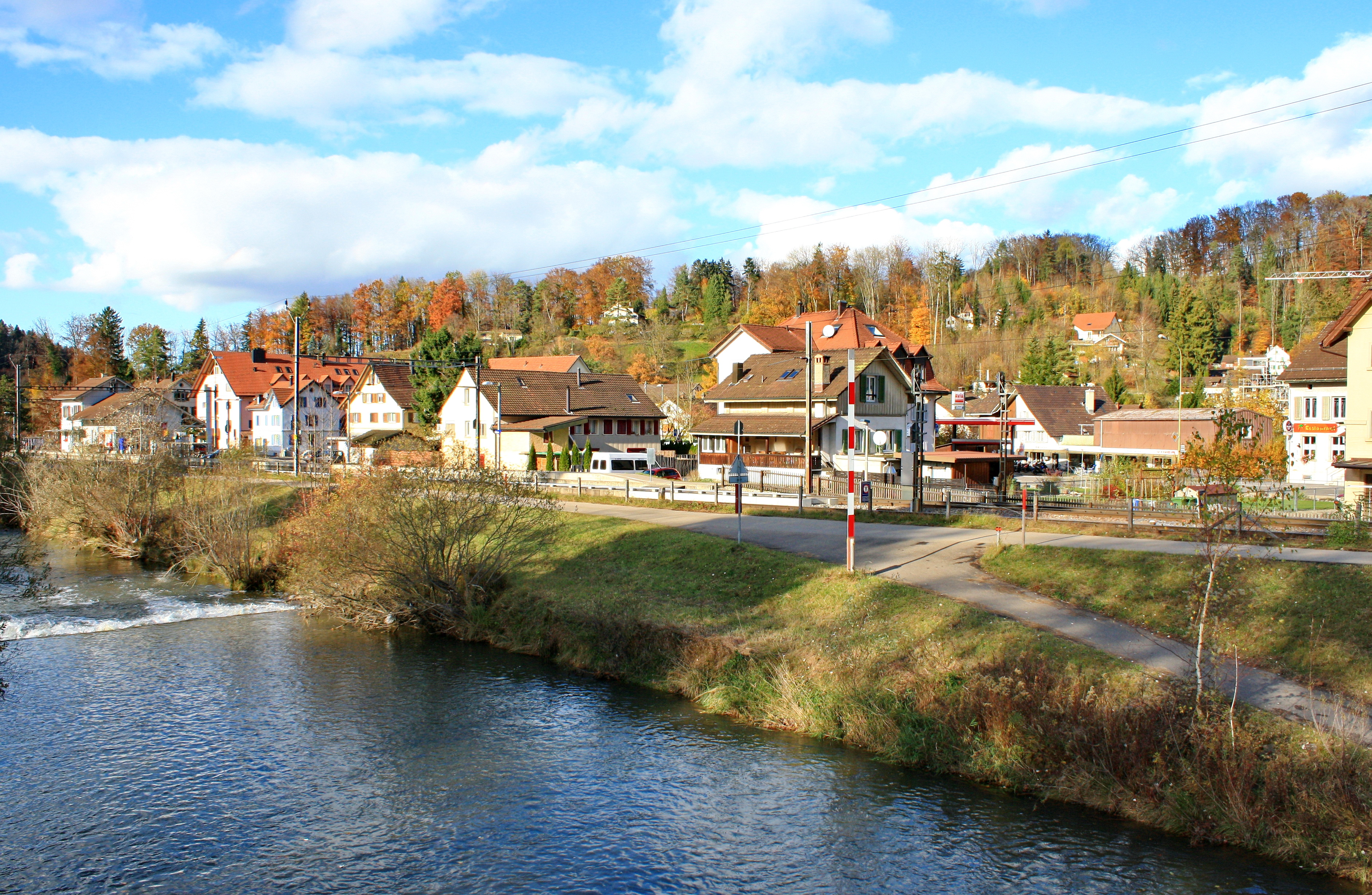
- Rikon and the Töss river (November 2009)
- Interactive map of Rikon im Tösstal
- Coordinates: 47°26′N 8°47′E
- Country: Switzerland
- Canton: Zürich
- District: Winterthur
- Municipality: Zell, Zurich
- Elevation: 512 m (1,680 ft)

Population (12/2008)
  - Total: 1,364
- Time zone: UTC+1 (CET)
  - Summer (DST): UTC+2 (CEST)
- Postal code: 8486
- Website: www.zell.ch (in German)

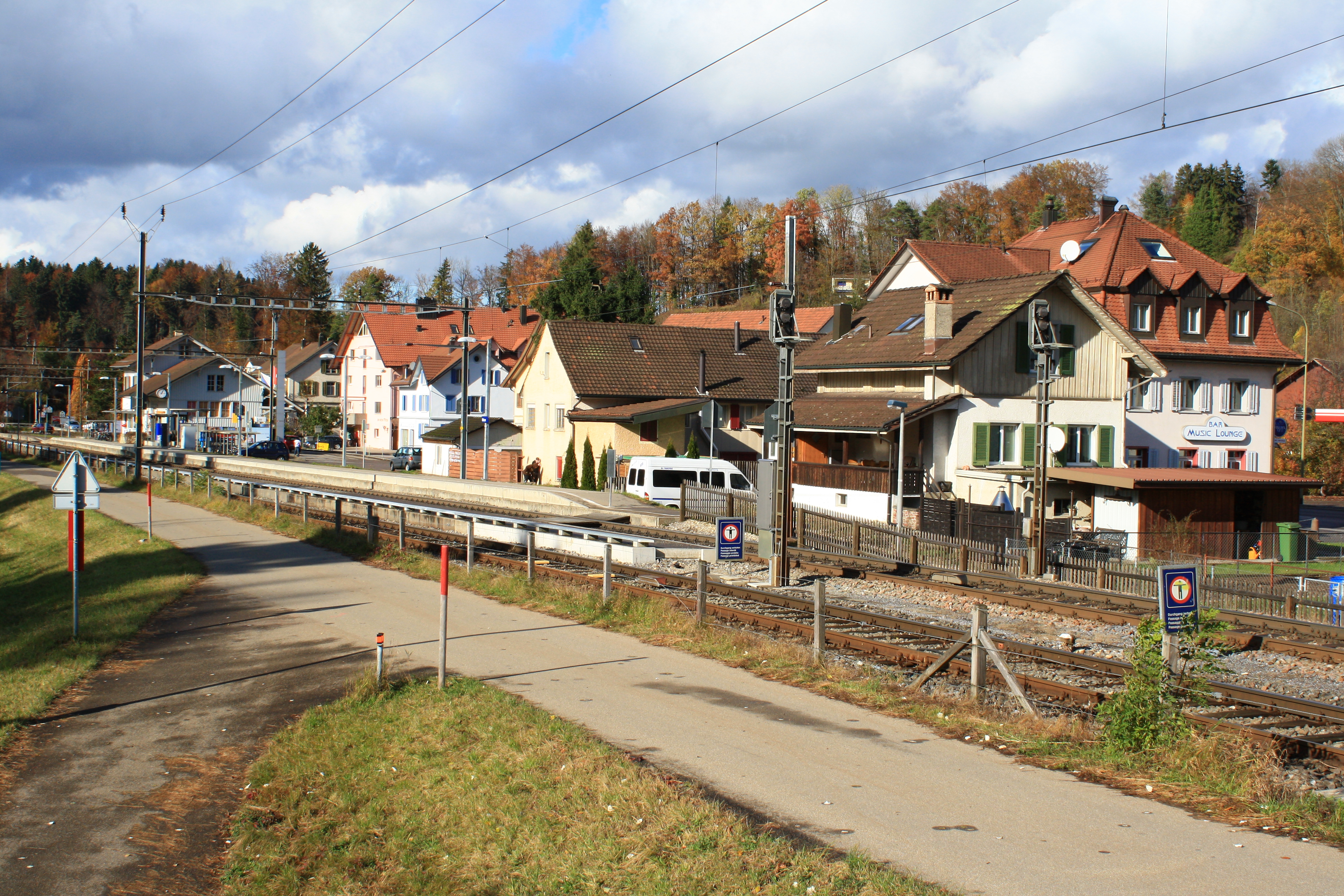
S-Bahn Zürich train station

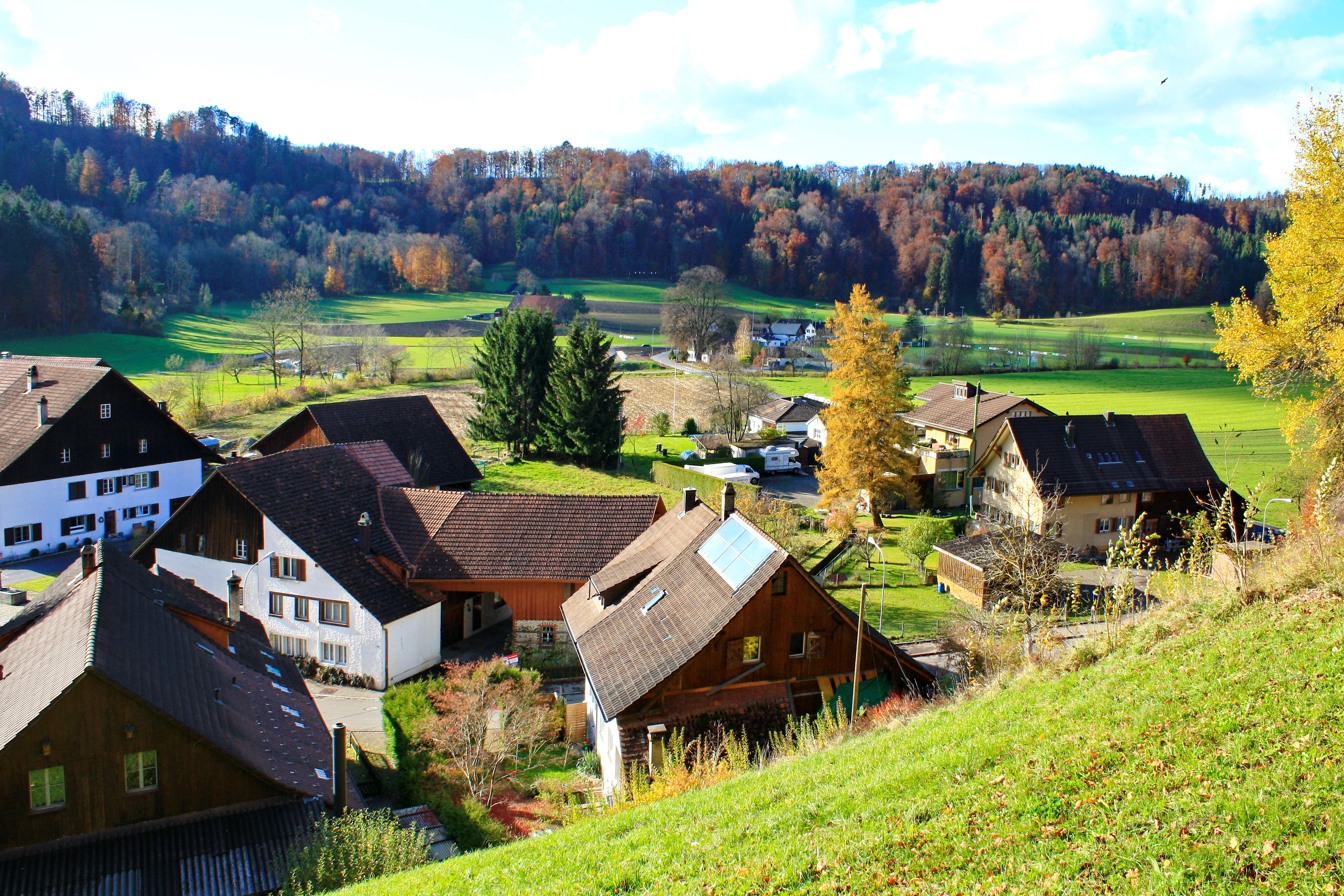
Unter-Rikon

Rikon im Tösstal is a village within the municipality of Zell in the canton of Zurich in Switzerland.

== Geography ==
Rikon is located in the district of Winterthur within the Töss Valley. Zell-Rikon belongs to the urban area of the northwestern city of Winterthur. In Rikon is a Tibetan monastery, the Tibet Institute Rikon, located. Neighbouring settlements are Kyburg, Kollbrunn, Schlatt, Wildberg and Winterthur.

== Education ==
Education covers Kindergarten, Primarschule and Sekundarschule levels. Higher school levels are located in Winterthur.

== Transportation ==
The Tösstalstrasse motorway was built in 1837, the Tösstalbahn railway in 1872/76. Rikon railway station is a stop of the S-Bahn Zürich on the lines S11 and S26.

== History ==
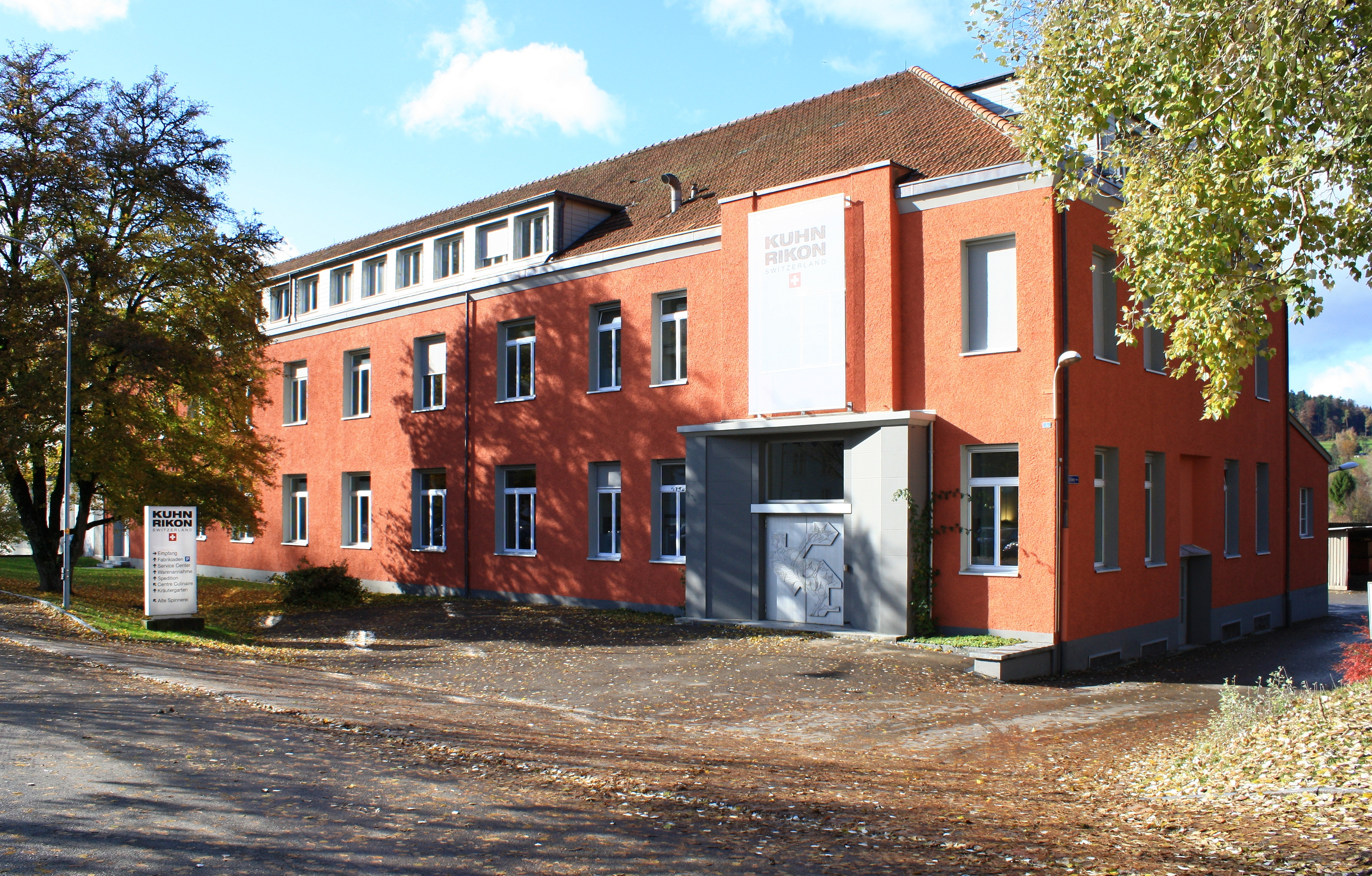
Kuhn Rikon AG administration building

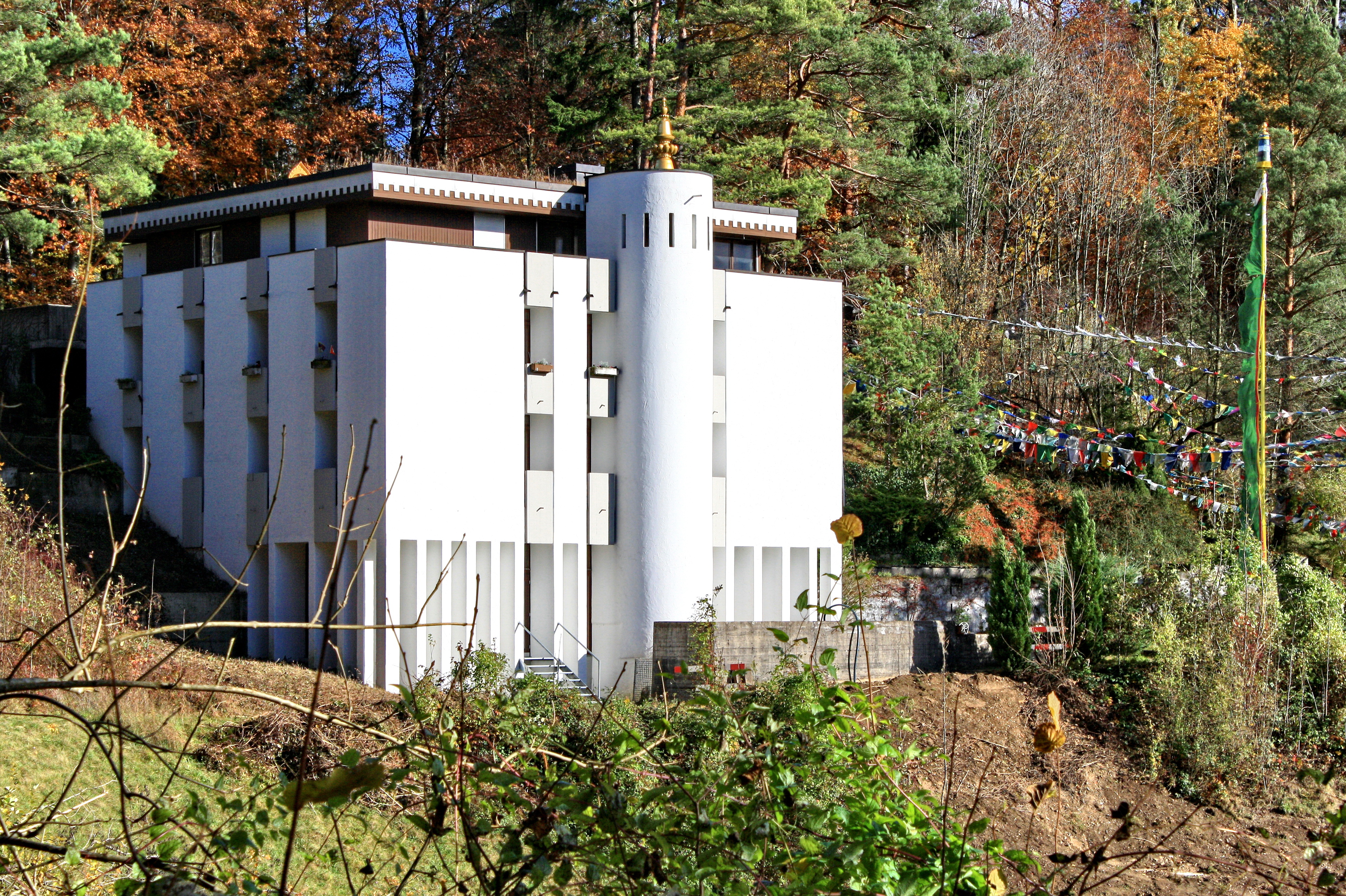
Tibet Institute Rikon

Aerial view (1958)

Near the church of Zell, the remains of a Roman Empire estate have been found. First mentioned in the years 741 and 744 as «Cella» (Zell), the municipalities Zell and Turbenthal were given to the nunnery on Lützelau island on Lake Zürich by the Alamannic noblewoman Beata. Then after, the area was given to the St. Gallen Abbey, and as a fief to the House of Habsburg, including a watermill in Rikon. As part of the Grafschaft Kyburg the area was sold to the city of Zürich around 1450. In 1817/18 a textile manufacture was established in Rikon, and in 1925 the best known Metallwarenfabrik AG Heinrich Kuhn, now Kuhn Rikon AG. Since 1934 Hinter-Rikon is part of the municipality Zell.

In 1961, Switzerland was one of the first countries in the Western hemisphere, that gave new homes on a large scale to Tibetan refugees. Henri and Jacques Kuhn (owners of Metallwarenfabrik AG Heinrich Kuhn) offered work and accommodation to a group of refugees. The monastic Tibet Institute Rikon was founded, according to the advice and under the patronage of the 14th Dalai Lama. On November 9, 1968, the monastic Tibet Institute was consecrated by the two leading teachers of the Dalai Lama, Trijang Rinpoche and Ling Rinpoche. Their story was featured in the November 1968 issue of National Geographic in an article by Laura Pilarski: "Little Tibet in Switzerland."
