= Economic history of South Africa =

Historical GDP per capita in South Africa

Prior to the arrival of the Dutch settlers in the 17th century, the economy of what was to become South Africa was dominated by subsistence agriculture and hunting.

In the north, central and east of the country tribes of Bantu peoples occupied land on a communal basis under tribal chiefdoms. It was an overwhelmingly pastoral economy and wealth was measured in the number of cattle men held. Population growth had created a land pressure that had seen the tribes move steadily from the origins in central east Africa.

In the southern and western parts of the country, San (Bushmen) peoples led nomadic lives based on hunting and the Khoikhoi (Hottentots) peoples led a pastoral existence.

In the first half of the 20th century, agriculture and mining were the largest parts of the South African economy.

The end of apartheid was followed by substantial improvements in housing, health care, and access to basic government services for the South African population.

== Early history ==
The first evidence of pottery and agriculture (sheep) in South Africa can be found in the period of 350-150 BCE, while metals date back to the 52-252 CE period. The earliest occurrence of cattle farming was in the 5th century CE and the Iron Age reached modern-day Kwa-Zulu Natal around 700 CE.

The Kingdom of Mapungubwe (c.11th – 13th century CE) was a medieval state in South Africa located at the confluence of the Shashe and Limpopo rivers. This saw the beginnings of South Africa's gold and ivory trade and the production of jewelry and art. The Golden Rhinoceros of Mapungubwe was discovered on a royal grave at the site of Mapungubwe Hill, and was on display at the British Museum as part of an exhibition celebrating the art of South Africa. Mapungubwe also saw the first development of stonemasonry in what is now South Africa. Glass beads and Chinese ceramics were imported.

== European settlement ==
In 1652 a permanent European settlement was established in Cape Town in the far south west of the country. It was not originally planned as a colony but as a refreshment station. Malnutrition, especially scurvy, a vitamin C deficiency arising from a lack of fresh fruit and vegetables, was a problem for the ships of the Dutch East India Company that were plying trade between the Netherlands and the Dutch East Indies, modern Indonesia.

To deal with the problems, the company established a garden at the foot of Table Mountain and bartered cattle from the Khoikhoi to supply to passing ships.

However, the inevitable development of a permanent European settlement at the Cape triggered profound change over the next two and a half centuries. A struggle developed between the Europeans and the San, who were pushed into the Kalahari Desert region. Protracted skirmishes and wars with the Khoikhoi (Quena) clans and tribes resulted in enslavement of many and the destruction of a cohesive Khoikhoi communal identity, which disappeared.

Land hunger led to wars between the Bantu as the settlers migrated eastwards from the original settlement in Cape Town.

Between the wars, commerce developed between the settlers and the indigenous peoples. Sales of produce and stock saw the development of a black, landed peasantry..

== Immigrant skills ==
The Europeans meanwhile imported slaves from Malaya as artisans. Their skills have contributed to the clothing being a major industry in the Cape today. There were other waves of migration from Europe. Persecuted Huguenots from France turned their hands to wine production and Germans and British grew the nascent industrial base and developed modern farming methods. Contrary to popular belief, slaves did not heavily work the farms of the Cape, as that was done contractually by the Khoi, but mostly by the Dutch settlers. Slaves were also imported to the South African region for work on the large scale wine plantations founded by European settlers. Altogether these ambitious efforts increased living standards of the white population substantially.

The province of Natal, a British colony, was found suitable for sugar production but the local Zulu tribes could not be attracted as cane cutters as they lacked the skill and competency to work. Indentured labour was brought from India. The descendants of these labourers play an active role in commerce and industry today.

Additional to slavery, there was another form of coerced labor supply: The Zulu and other kingdoms used young men for coerced labor both as warriors and pastorals. The European migrants diverged: the Continental Europeans merged to speak a Dutch-derived language, Afrikaans, and the settlers from the British Isles continued to speak English which became the language of commerce. This dichotomy was also seen in the economy, as farmers were mainly Afrikaans-speaking while English-speaking South Africans were drawn to commerce and industry.

== Boer republics ==
The Afrikaners formed two independent inland republics, the Zuid Afrikaanse Republiek (ZAR) and the Oranje Vrystaat (Orange Free State). On the coast the British occupied the Cape Colony and Natal.

The discovery of diamonds in the Cape Province in 1866 the discovery of gold twenty years later on the Witwatersrand in the ZAR transformed the economy and attracted considerable foreign interest. The subsequent diamond and gold rushes saw further migrations of a range of nationalities including Cornish miners and eastern European Jews amongst others.

In 1899, the British went to war once again with the Boer Republics. After overcoming several initial setbacks, the British managed to take the initiative by 1900; invaded and soon conquered the Freestate and ZAR, later uniting them as two of the four provinces in the Union of South Africa in 1910.

But perhaps the greatest impact was the influx of international capital to finance the mining operations, including the arrival of Cecil John Rhodes who formed De Beers and Anglo-American. During the age of African colonization, due to its large amount of gold and diamond mines, South Africa attracted the majority (55,8%) of overseas investments to the whole African continent.

== Migrant labour ==
The indigenous people had no knowledge about the mining economy and this led to a shortage of labour on the mines. In a measure to force labour to the mines, Rhodes, who had turned from forming the De Beers Company to politics, secured the passing of the Glen Grey Act in 1894. The Act obliged the payment of tax with the specific aim of forcing peasant farmers, who were not part of the money economy, to find work that paid money to pay the taxes. The Act was a deliberate move by Rhodes to force labour to the mines.

This was the start of a migratory labour system in which black men travelled to the mines to work leaving their families in the tribal areas.

The supply of labour became more than sufficient and the mining companies formed a buying cartel through their association, the Chamber of Mines. This enabled them to create a monopsony (market conditions where there is only one buyer) that suppressed wages. The mines also attracted labour from neighbouring countries such as Rhodesia (now Zambia and Zimbabwe), Nyasaland (now Malawi) and Mozambique (that was then a Portuguese colony) that kept wages of black workers down.

== Rand Rebellion ==
South African gold mines are deep and expensive to run and the mine companies endeavoured to keep costs down. However, in trying to train blacks for skilled jobs, they ran into conflict with white miners. The white miners resisted the integration of black miners in 1922 in the area around the centre of gold mining: the Witwatersrand.

The dispute quickly escalated with the South African Communist Party joining on the side of the miners while also promoting the idea of racial equality. The standoff escalated from a labour dispute to a full scale uprising labeled the Rand Rebellion. Eventually more than 20,000 fully equipped Union Defence Force troops had to be dispatched. All attempts at negotiations failed and the rebellion was eventually put down by "considerable military firepower and at the cost of over 200 lives". Some white miners were sentenced to hang for their roles in instigating and leading the uprising.

== Apartheid ==
In 1948, a government was elected that introduced the policy of apartheid (segregation) that was aimed to allow different racial groups to progress in their own separate areas. In the two decades following the rise to power of the National Party, whites (particularly Afrikaners) rose above all other ethnic groups in South Africa through their dominant performance in the labour market. Throughout the 1960s, South Africa had economic dominance over the rest of Africa and was considered the only developed country in Africa by the United Nations economic criteria. White South Africans enjoyed standards of living comparable with or higher than the West. Throughout this period South Africa produced twice as much electricity and six times as much steel as the rest of the African continent combined while at the same time, accounting for 43% of Africa's entire mineral production output.

Economic dominance during this period was made possible by Black South Africans and migratory labour from Malawi, Lesotho and Portuguese Mozambique who all experienced poor working conditions and relativity low wages. Real wages for nonwhite South African miners declined between the passage of the Mines and Works Act in 1911 and 1971, while nonwhite workers in the manufacturing industry earned 18 percent of the wages of white workers. The government at the time even admitted that Black labour was crucial to their economic success and hence talks of territorial and political separation along racial lines at the time was deemed a threat to economic expansion for South Africa. By the beginning of the 1980s South Africa had the highest wealth inequality in the world, with 40 percent of the population earning just 6 percent of the national income. Infant mortality rates for blacks and Coloureds reached 13 times the rates of whites, with one-quarter of newborns dying within a year.

As noted by one historian, "Full employment, in combination with labour controls, limitations on the free movement and employment of non-whites, and the use of colour bars at company level, contributed to high levels of disposable income for the white population".

Many English-speaking South Africans had participated in the heavy discrimination that preceded apartheid, and tacitly supported the legislation while paying lip service to opposing the laws. By so doing apartheid managed to create a system in which black people were pushed to the margins of their land through the imposition of the Natives Land Act, 1913. As a result, many blacks are unskilled, illiterate, and have low living standards. Their schooling system, the Bantu languages education, was based on the notion that black people cannot progress fast enough in scientific subjects due to lower intellectual skills, and has resulted in many being excluded from work requiring skill.

== Volkscapitalisme ==
Under the Nationalist Party, the country embarked upon a dirigiste program of economic expansion involving the creation of several state-owned enterprises (or "parastatals", as they were called), including Iscor (steel), Sasol (synthetic fuel), Eskom (electricity), and later Transnet (rail), and Telkom (telecommunications). These grew in tandem with party-controlled entities such as Volkskas (banking), Sanlam (insurance) and Naspers (media).

== Business support for apartheid ==
With the support of foreign capital, the mines and the mining finance houses, largely dominated by English-speaking South Africans, prospered under the system of apartheid and shunned outright opposition. In return for the continued monopsony of labour purchase for the mines that kept wages low and outlawed trade unions, the English-speaking mining companies tolerated job reservation that prevented blacks from developing skills. Thousands of foreign businesses from the United Kingdom, West Germany, and the United States opened firms in South Africa to exploit the lower wages of nonwhite workers. This is debated, however, as policies to restrict labour supply to whites only resulted in higher miner wages than under a system of equal employment.

Over time the mining companies introduced changes to lower their costs but the alliance with the government continued.

White trade unionism was allowed but there were no black trade unions until the 1970s.

== Sanctions ==
The imposition of international sanctions on the country began economic pressure that saw the unravelling of apartheid. There were oil sanctions but South Africa continued to be able to buy oil on international markets and developed technology that allowed the conversion of coal into oil. A small gas field was discovered off the coast of the Cape.

But the most damaging isolation was the denial of investment funds and the boycott of South African investments particularly by influential universities and foundations in the United States. These boycotts limited the capital available to South African businesses.

Ironically, during the 1980s gold reached its highest price as a result of international tensions reaping huge profits for the mining company conglomerates. However, because of currency restrictions and bans on the sales of Krugerrands in some countries, they were unable to invest abroad. The result was that they used their surplus funds to buy up businesses in virtually every activity in the economy.

However, the financial benefit for the mining companies of continuing to support the system eroded as international capital stopped flowing into the country.

== Unsustainable burden of sanctions ==
In 1990 State President Frederik Willem (F.W.) de Klerk recognised the economic unsustainability of the burden of international sanctions and released Nelson Mandela the nationalist leader and unbanned the African National Congress (ANC) that Mandela led.

Despite some fears that the country could become unmanageable because of tribal conflict or even a military take over by the white-dominated armed forces de Klerk and Mandela guided the country to democratic elections in 1994 with Mandela as president.

Despite socialist rhetoric and support from socialist countries in its early years the ANC maintained the mixed economy and encouraged the market economy including relaxing foreign exchange controls.

In January 1991, SACP general secretary Joe Slovo, DP Finance Spokesman Harry Schwarz and Deputy Finance Minister Org Marais, debated the state's role in a post-apartheid economy, in an historic debate organised by the Institute for a Democratic Alternative for South Africa.

== Black empowerment ==
At the same time they embarked on the Reconstruction and Development Plan to improve services including housing, education and health to blacks only as a means to achieve equity.

The ANC also initiated a system of "black economic empowerment" which its aim was to establish equity to the previously disadvantaged races and the race that is currently disadvantaged through affirmative action.

== Land hunger again ==
A major source of stress remains the redistribution of land. Under apartheid legislation beginning with the Natives Land Act, 1913 73% of land was in so called "white areas" and many blacks had been uprooted and removed to previous tribal areas to keep crime and vandalism away from important land.

The slow legal and bureaucratic process of restitution is causing impatience among blacks and concern among white farmers that South Africa may go down the route of neighbouring Zimbabwe where land is being unilaterally seized by the government and its supporters, causing food shortages as the new owners tend to have less farming experience.

== Infrastructure and Assets ==
The needs of the mines to maintain internal security under apartheid had seen parts of South Africa develop an infrastructure that was sufficient to cater to business in the cities and as a connection between provinces (states). This has served the country well in the post apartheid years but is going to waste as infrastructure has not been well maintained by the ruling government.

Foreign investment has flowed from South Africa around the globe: several major companies including Anglo-American, Old Mutual and South African Breweries are now listed on the London Stock Exchange.

== See also ==
- List of South African inventions and discoveries
- Economy of South Africa
- Economy of Africa
- Economic History Society of Southern Africa
- Investment Analysts Society of Southern Africa
- Economics Research South Africa
- Economic Society of South Africa
- SA Metal Group
- Wealth inequality in South Africa
