= Uitenhage (House of Assembly of South Africa constituency) =

South African constituency, 1910–1994

- Former constituency for the South African House of Assembly
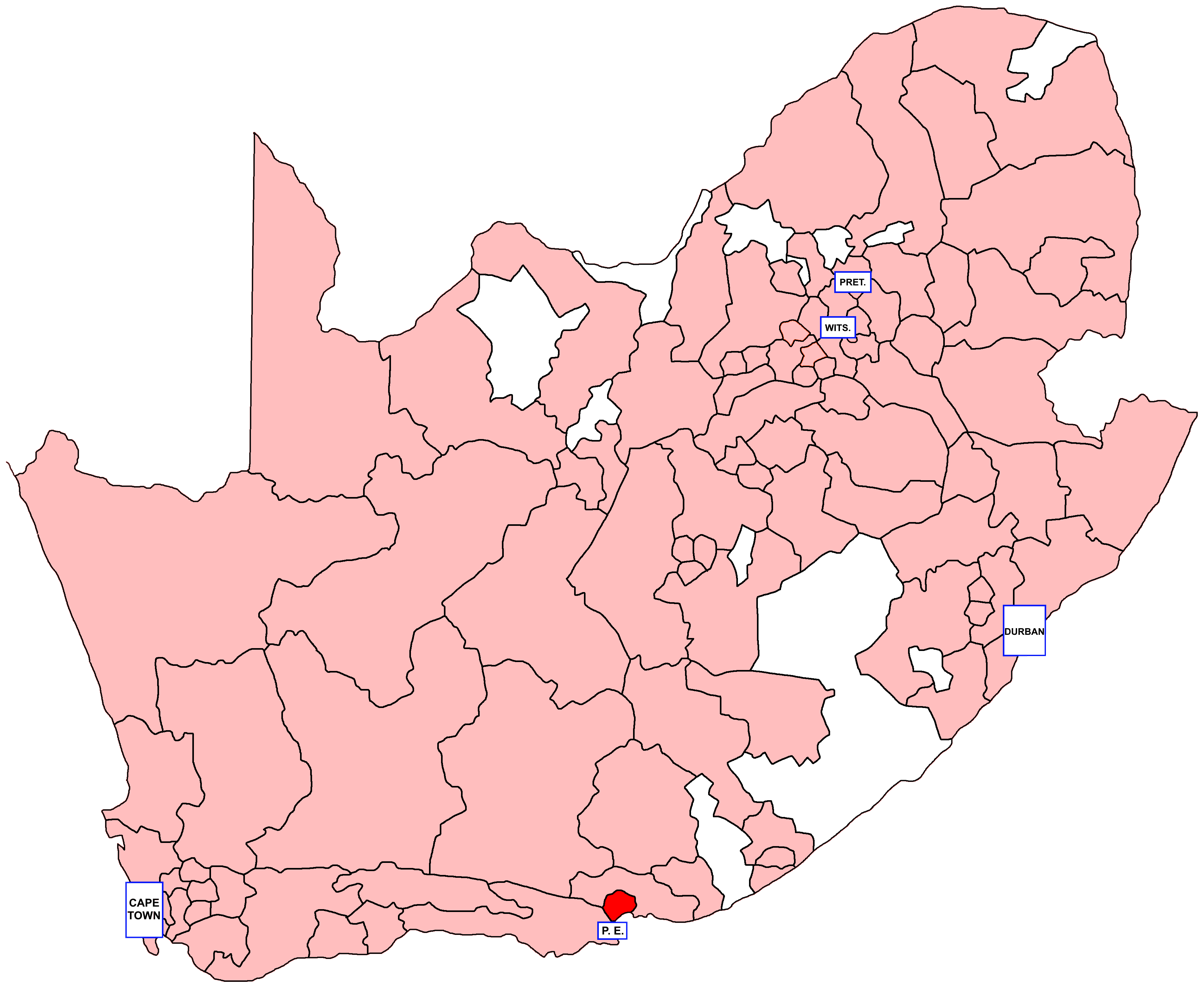
- Location of Uitenhage within South Africa (1981)
- Province: Cape of Good Hope
- Electorate: 16,280 (1989)

Former constituency
- Created: 1910
- Abolished: 1994
- Number of members: 1
- Last MHA: Willem Botha (CP)
- Replaced by: Eastern Cape

Uitenhage was a constituency in the Cape Province of South Africa, which existed from 1910 to 1994. The constituency covered a part of the Eastern Cape centred on the town of Uitenhage (since renamed Kariega). Throughout its existence it elected one member to the House of Assembly and one to the Cape Provincial Council.

== Franchise notes ==
When the Union of South Africa was formed in 1910, the electoral qualifications in use in each pre-existing colony were kept in place. The Cape Colony had implemented a "colour-blind" franchise known as the Cape Qualified Franchise, which included all adult literate men owning more than £75 worth of property (controversially raised from £25 in 1892), and this initially remained in effect after the colony became the Cape Province. As of 1908, 22,784 out of 152,221 electors in the Cape Colony were "Native or Coloured". Eligibility to serve in Parliament and the Provincial Council, however, was restricted to whites from 1910 onward.

The first challenge to the Cape Qualified Franchise came with the Women's Enfranchisement Act, 1930 and the Franchise Laws Amendment Act, 1931, which extended the vote to women and removed property qualifications for the white population only – non-white voters remained subject to the earlier restrictions. In 1936, the Representation of Natives Act removed all black voters from the common electoral roll and introduced three "Native Representative Members", white MPs elected by the black voters of the province and meant to represent their interests in particular. A similar provision was made for Coloured voters with the Separate Representation of Voters Act, 1951, and although this law was challenged by the courts, it went into effect in time for the 1958 general election, which was thus held with all-white voter rolls for the first time in South African history. The all-white franchise would continue until the end of apartheid and the introduction of universal suffrage in 1994.

== History ==
Unlike most of the Eastern Cape, Uitenhage had a largely Afrikaans-speaking electorate, and tended to vote more like its neighbours to the north and west than the ones to its east. It was held by the South African Party throughout that party's existence, and in 1934, its MP Gordon Dolley followed the SAP majority into the United Party. Dolley continued to hold the seat in the face of stronger and stronger National Party challenges, until it fell to the NP-allied Afrikaner Party in 1948, that party's only seat in the Cape Province. This would be echoed in the last whites-only election in 1989, in which Uitenhage was one of only two Cape seats (along with Kuruman) to be won by the pro-apartheid Conservative Party. Its last MP, Willem Botha, stood for re-election to the non-racial parliament in 1994 as a member of the Freedom Front.

== Members ==
Election	Member	Party
1910	H. E. S. Fremantle	South African
1915	A. H. Garcia	South African
1920	W. R. Burch	South African
1921	W. R. Burch	South African
1923 by	F. T. Bates	South African
1924	F. T. Bates	South African
1929	F. T. Bates	South African
1933	F. T. Bates	South African
1934 by	Gordon Dolley	South African
1934	Gordon Dolley	United
1938	Gordon Dolley	United
1943	Gordon Dolley	United
1948	David Conradie	Afrikaner
1951	David Conradie	National
1953	David Conradie	National
1958	F. H. Badenhorst	National
1961	F. H. Badenhorst	National
1965 by	J. G. Swiegers	National
1966	J. G. Swiegers	National
1970	J. G. Swiegers	National
1974	J. G. Swiegers	National
1977	J. G. Swiegers	National
1981	D. E. T. le Roux	National
1987	D. E. T. le Roux	National
1989	Willem Botha	Conservative
1994	constituency abolished	

== Detailed results ==
=== Elections in the 1910s ===
General election 1910: Uitenhage
Party	Candidate	Votes	%	±%
South African	H. E. S. Fremantle	1,139	55.4	New
Unionist	C. W. Mackay	917	44.6	New
Majority		222	10.8	N/A
South African win (new seat)				

General election 1915: Uitenhage
Party	Candidate	Votes	%	±%
South African	A. H. Garcia	1,646	60.8	+5.4
National	H. E. S. Fremantle	1,061	39.2	New
Majority		585	21.6	N/A
Turnout		2,707	86.1	N/A
South African hold		Swing	N/A	

=== Elections in the 1920s ===
General election 1920: Uitenhage
Party	Candidate	Votes	%	±%
South African	W. R. Burch	1,679	53.2	−7.6
National	H. E. S. Fremantle	1,478	46.8	+7.6
Majority		201	6.4	−15.2
Turnout		3,157	81.6	−4.5
South African hold		Swing	-7.6	

General election 1921: Uitenhage
Party	Candidate	Votes	%	±%
South African	W. R. Burch	2,046	56.9	+3.7
National	O. A. Oosthuizen	1,551	43.1	−3.7
Majority		495	13.8	+7.4
Turnout		3,597	79.7	−1.9
South African hold		Swing	+3.7	

Uitenhage by-election, 22 June 1923
Party	Candidate	Votes	%	±%
South African	F. T. Bates	1,828	49.9	−7.0
National	J. J. H. Bellingan	1,770	48.3	+5.2
Rejected ballots		64	1.8	N/A
Majority		58	1.6	−12.2
Turnout		3,662	82.8	+3.1
South African hold		Swing	-6.1	

General election 1924: Uitenhage
Party	Candidate	Votes	%	±%
South African	F. T. Bates	1,785	51.2	−5.7
National	J. J. H. Bellingan	1,551	47.5	+4.4
Rejected ballots		47	1.3	N/A
Majority		129	3.7	−10.1
Turnout		3,488	89.3	+9.6
South African hold		Swing	-5.1	

General election 1929: Uitenhage
Party	Candidate	Votes	%	±%
South African	F. T. Bates	1,966	56.4	+5.2
National	P. J. Olivier	1,460	41.9	−5.6
Rejected ballots		62	1.7	+0.4
Majority		506	13.5	+10.8
Turnout		3,488	87.3	−2.0
South African hold		Swing	+5.4	

=== Elections in the 1930s ===
General election 1933: Uitenhage
Party	Candidate	Votes	%	±%
South African	F. T. Bates	3,637	67.4	+11.0
Independent	A. J. Sellick	1,675	31.0	New
Rejected ballots		88	1.6	-0.1
Majority		1,962	36.3	N/A
Turnout		5,400	72.8	−14.5
South African hold		Swing	N/A	

Uitenhage by-election, 14 November 1934
Party	Candidate	Votes	%	±%
South African	Gordon Dolley	3,009	56.1	−11.3
Labour	C. L. Henderson	1,675	42.2	New
Rejected ballots		91	1.7	+0.1
Majority		742	13.8	N/A
Turnout		5,367	79.7	+6.9
South African hold		Swing	N/A	

General election 1938: Uitenhage
Party	Candidate	Votes	%	±%
United	Gordon Dolley	3,972	57.8	−9.6
Purified National	H. J. Killian	2,838	41.3	New
Rejected ballots		62	0.9	-0.7
Majority		1,134	16.5	N/A
Turnout		6,872	90.0	+17.2
United hold		Swing	N/A	
