= Johannes de Villiers Graaff =

South African welfare economist

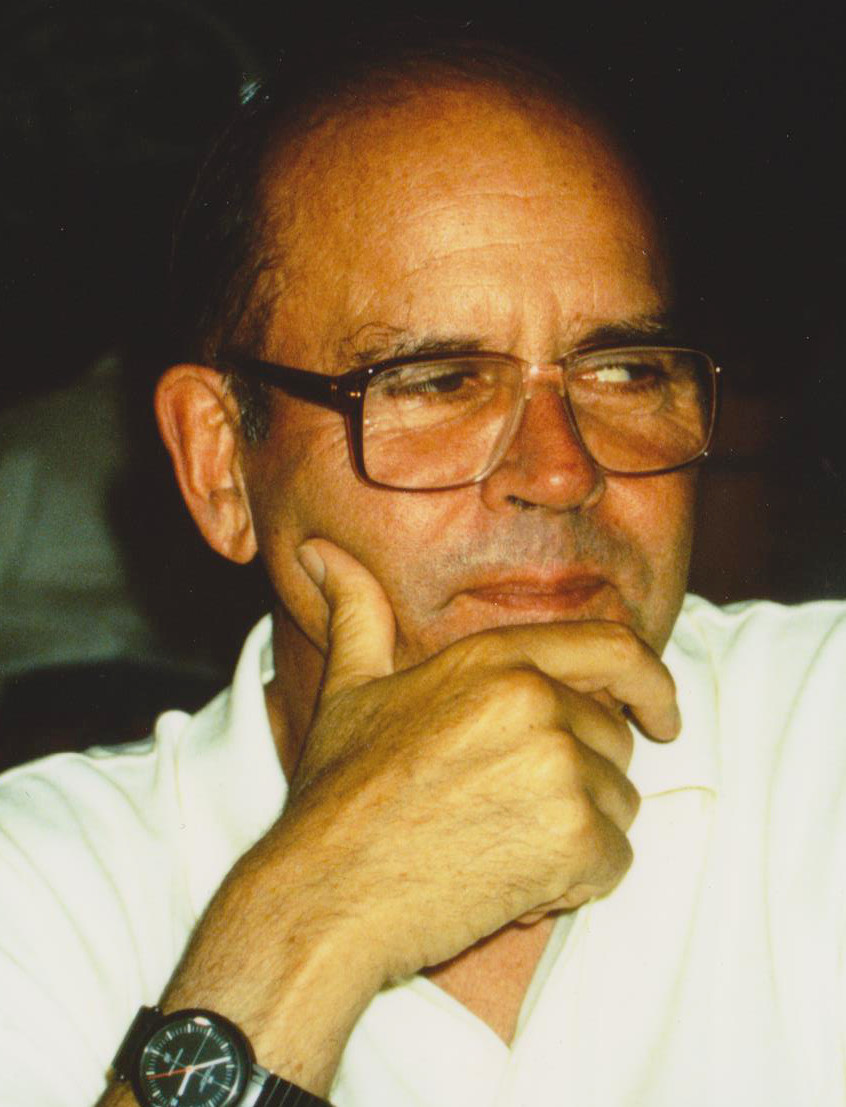
- Born: 19 February 1928; Muizenberg, Cape Town, Union of South Africa
- Died: 6 January 2015 (aged 86); Cape Town, South Africa

Academic background
- Education: St John's College, Cambridge (PhD); University of Cape Town (BA)
- Influences: Abram Bergson

Academic work
- Discipline: Welfare economics
- School or tradition: Welfare economics
- Institutions: University of Cambridge, Nedbank

Johannes de Villiers Graaff (also known as Jan de Van Graaff), better known as Jannie Graaff, (19 February 1928 – 6 January 2015) was a neoclassical South African welfare economist and mountaineer. Graaff is noted for his work on optimal savings rates, contributions to the creation of the social welfare function and for his 1957 magnum opus Theoretical Welfare Economics.

== Family and early life ==
Graaff was born in Muizenberg on 19 February 1928 into a wealthy Cape Town Afrikaans family. He was the youngest of Sir David Graaff, 1st Baronet's three children, his eldest brother was Sir De Villiers Graaff, 2nd Baronet. At the age of fifteen he matriculated from Diocesan College with the second highest marks in South Africa.

In 1951 he married Lillian Clare Thomson, daughter of Sir George Paget Thomson, and had six children with her.

== Academia and economics ==
Graaff graduated from the University of Cape Town and then went on to complete his PhD in economics at St John's College, Cambridge in 1950, where he lectured economics until 1953. In 1957 he published Theoretical Welfare Economics, a revised version of his PhD thesis that pioneered the concept of welfare economics. The book had six re-prints in its first ten years and was regarded as a highly important work in the field of Welfare Economics.

He left Cambridge due to his dislike of for the politics and infighting of academia and instead bought a farm in the Koue Bokkeveld region of South Africa. His departure from academia led Paul Samuelson to comment that welfare economics would have been vastly different "if Jannie had not decided to go farming". Although he had ostensibly left academia he remained a visiting lecturer at the University of Cape Town and Stellenbosch University. Graaff was President of the Economic Society of South Africa for the period from 1968 to 1969 and was important in supporting the South African Journal of Economics.

Graaff made a major contribution to the social welfare function by being the first to derive an equilibrium relationship between equity and national income. Another important contribution made by Graaff was his development of a measure to judge "the well-being of an economy that went beyond the familiar Pareto efficiency criterion: although an economy may be operating efficiently in the sense of utilising all available resources, this may not coincide with the most desired distributional outcome."

== Post-academic career ==
Graaff played a large role in the formation of South Africa's tax code. He was a believer in the "promotion of equity through taxation and in tax as an instrument of redistribution." In the 1970s he sat on John Vorster's economic advisory committee. In the 1980s Graaff was the dominant intellectual figure on the Margo commission which reformed South African tax law. He played a large role in the commission's decision to collect more money from a more efficient, indirect tax thereby leading to the adoption of a value added tax in South Africa. Graaff sat on the Katz commission from 1994 to 1998 which looked at how the South African tax system could best help the post-Apartheid South African government's social democratic policies thereby leading to the restructuring of the South African Revenue Service as an independent body.

Graaff was also the managing director of the wealth management firm Graaff's Trust and the urban development firm Milnerton Estates, a company that developed a large number of Cape Town's suburbs along the West Coast such as Parklands and Milnerton.

== Mountaineering ==
Graaff was one of South Africa's most active and accomplished mountaineers, pioneering mountain climbing routes in East Africa and the Himalayas. This included being one of the first people to officially summit the Spitzkoppen mountain in Namibia. He also wrote a number of articles on mountaineering in the South African Mountaineering Journal.

In 1952, with his wife, he made the first ascent of Deo Tibba 6,001 m (19,688 ft) and Manirang 6,593 m (21,631 ft) in Himachal Pradesh.

== Death ==
He died on 6 January 2015, aged 86, in Kenilworth, Cape Town after incurring an accidental head injury on Long Street, Cape Town.

== Major works ==
- Fluctuations in Income Concentration, 1956, South African Journal of Economics.
- Rothbarth's `Virtual Pricing System' and the Slutsky Equation, 1947, Review of. Economic Studies, 15, 91–95
- A Note on the Relative Merit of Taxes and Subsidies, 1947, South African Journal of Economics.
- Towards an Austerity Theory of Value, 1948, South African Journal of Economics.
- On Optimum Tariff Structures, 1949, Review of. Economic Studies.
- Theoretical Welfare Economics, 1957, Cambridge, UK: Cambridge University Press.
- Equity and Efficiency as Components of the General Welfare, 1977, South African Journal of Economics.
