= Willem Botha (disambiguation) =

Willem Botha may refer to:

- Willem Botha (born 1987), South African singer and actor
- Willem Botha (politician) (born 1943), South African politician, born Willem Abraham Botha
- Willie Botha (athlete) (1912–1967), South African athlete, born Willem Christiaan Botha
- Willie Botha (politician) (born 1943), South African politician, born Willem Jacobus Botha

== See also ==
- Botha
