= Henry Fremantle =

South African scholar and politician (1874-1931)

Henry Eardley Stephen Fremantle (6 August 1874 – 6 September 1931) was an English-born South African scholar and politician.

Fremantle was the only prominent English-speaker involved in the founding of the National Party, but resigned from the NP in 1922 when the party passed a resolution that South Africa should have the right to secede from the United Kingdom, Fremantle's homeland, something he could not identify with at all. He was a liberal who had strayed into the wrong camp, according to Dr. AC Partridge who wrote articles about him in both the South African Biographical Dictionary and the Standard Encyclopaedia of Southern Africa.

== Family ==
Born in Bedwell Park, Hatfield, Hertfordshire, Fremantle was the son of The Hon. and Very Rev. Dr. William Henry Fremantle, sometimes Dean of Ripon and his wife, Isabella Maria Eardley (died 1901). His father was the second son of Thomas Fremantle, 1st Baron Cottesloe. Lord Cottesloe was the eldest brother of Admiral Sir Charles Fremantle after whom the town of Fremantle in Western Australia was named.

Mrs. Fremantle, daughter of Sir Culling Eardley, took an active part in charitable work in the dioceses to which her husband was appointed and was well known for her work among the sick and destitute. Sir Culling was a Christian campaigner for religious freedom and one of the founders of the Evangelical Alliance. Sir Culling, who inherited numerous estates, changed his surname from Smith to Eardley by royal grant in 1847. Fremantle's maternal grandmother (Sir Culling's mother), Charlotte Elizabeth (died 1826), was the daughter of Sampson Eardley, 1st Baron Eardley, and thus the granddaughter of the Jewish financier Sampson Gideon (February 1699– 17 October 1762). He left a fortune of £350,000. Although he was a practising Jew, his wife (Jane, died 1778) was a Christian, as were his son and two daughters. Henry Fremantle's paternal grandfather was Sir Culling Smith (1768–1829), of Huguenot descent. The title of Baron Eardly (on Henry Fremantle's maternal side) did not survive, but Charlotte Elizabeth inherited a large part of the Eardly estate.

== Education ==
Henry was educated at Eton and Oriel College, Oxford, where he had a distinguished career, obtaining first class honours moderations as well as literae humaniores (1895–97); he then undertook research at the London School of Economics. Before moving to the South African College in Cape Town in February 1899 as Professor of English and Philosophy, he held the academic post of lecturer in Classics, first at the University of Wales, Aberystwyth, and then at Worcester College, Oxford. Three years after his arrival in South Africa, he succeeded in obtaining scholarships from Worcester College for students of the SA College, and from this arose the idea of the Rhodes Scholarships. The Rhodes Scholarships were more acceptable because they were worth 10 times more than the Worcester Scholarships.

== At the Cape ==
In Cape society Fremantle soon came to the fore as an interpreter of political science, finance and education. When he was elected in 1903 as a candidate of the South African Party (the new name of Jan Hendrik Hofmeyr's Afrikanerbond) to represent Uitenhage in the Cape Legislative Assembly, the senate of the college forced him to resign his professorship. Together with Albert Cartwright he then became co-editor of The South African News.

Fremantle ensured that he was bilingual within four years of his entry into politics (according to another source he already was; hence his good relationship with the Afrikanerbond), and through his assistance in connection with the financial organisation of the Closer Union Society, he worked hard for the closer union of the South African colonies which would finally result in the Union of South Africa in 1910.

He published The financial aspect of Union (1908) in which he wrote about the economic benefits that would follow from the creation of a national debt by pooling all the assets and liabilities of the four colonies. The New Nation, a survey of the condition and prospects of South Africa (London, 1909) was a more ambitious survey of the conditions and prospects in a united South Africa. It is considered his most valuable work. Fremantle took an active part in the debates in the Cape Legislative Assembly that preceded the adoption of the draft constitution for the Union. Initially he was a supporter of the policies of John X. Merriman, the leader of the South African Party, but in 1910 he joined the newly formed South African National Party (later the South African Party) which supported General Louis Botha, the first Prime Minister of the Union of South Africa.

From 1911 he was editor of The New Nation for several years, which was particularly concerned with promoting friendship between the races (Afrikaners and English speakers). This magazine, which initially supported Merriman's policies, was founded by A. D. Donovan and D. C. Boonzaier. Before and after Union, Fremantle was chairman of the five-member education commission appointed by the administrator of the Cape on 12 January 1910. The report of this commission, dated 12 January 1912, deals in detail with the state of education in the Cape as well as in the other provinces which, together with the Cape, formed the Union on 31 May 1910. This important Fremantle report is based on evidence given by experts from all parts of South Africa and deals with the main aspects of the education of white and coloured people, including curricula for basic subjects and the training of teachers. Two members, J. W. Jagger and P. H. W. Kettlewell, submitted a minority report on the educational difficulties that would arise from the use of both national languages as media of instruction.

As early as 1909 Fremantle wrote (in The New Nation) that the arrangement whereby a violent separation between lower and higher education is made by entrusting higher education to parliament and lower to the provincial councils cannot work. Towards the end of 1912 he aligned himself politically with General J. B. M. Hertzog who had just been dismissed from the Botha cabinet. Fremantle was one of the six members who voted with Hertzog against the government in the 1913 session, and one of the 12 who voted against the Botha government's proposal to conquer German South-West Africa in the extraordinary session of 1914. He was one of the founders of the National Party at the conference of 9 June 1915 at De Aar, and when Dr. When D. F. Malan was elected chairman at the Middelburg congress in September 1915, Fremantle became deputy chairman of the Cape National Party in the same year.

It was no surprise to anyone when he lost his seat in the Volksraad in the October 1915 general election during the First World War, receiving only 1 061 votes for the NP compared to AH Garcia of the SAP's 1 646. Nevertheless, he remained in touch with public affairs afterwards, through his membership of the Board of Trade and Industry and his work on the Financial Relations Commission. His other source of income was journalism, and as editor of The Interpreter from 1915 to 1917, he strove to improve race relations. When he was chairman of the Economic Society of South Africa in 1925, he published an important pamphlet, South African industries and banking, but his suggestion to establish an industrial bank to encourage national industries came to nothing.

He died in Cape Town.

== Assessment ==
As one of the founders of the NP, Fremantle overestimated his influence in that party. He was a reclusive man who, despite his acumen, culture and high sense of civic duty, did not make friends easily. He was never popular in parliamentary circles; both the SAP and the Unionist Party distrusted him and regarded him as a political adventurer.

He was an orator and a man who wrote on racial matters. He soon became an expert in financial matters and criticized the state budget, but his career was shipwrecked by his own personality. Despite his academic prestige and his quick wit, he was too much of a political opportunist; no party trusted him.

He could not agree with secession, the severance of ties with Britain; and at the 1920 congress in Bloemfontein he resigned from the party. However, it had long been clear that his views were too liberal for the traditionalists of the former Boer Republic.

== Family ==
He was married twice, in 1899 to Margaret McDonald (died 1909), daughter of Alexander McDonald, Keeper of the Oxford University Galleries, and in 1910 to Helen Eksteen, daughter of JJ Eksteen of the farm Deze Hoek, Piketberg district. His only daughter, Isabella Margaret Eleanor Fremantle, became professor of classical languages at the Huguenot College, Wellington.
