= Deo Tibba =

Mountain in Himachal Pradesh, India

- Location within Himachal Pradesh Location within India

Highest point
- Elevation: 6,001 m (19,688 ft)
- Coordinates: 32°11′51″N 77°22′57″E

Geography
- Country: India
- State: Himachal Pradesh
- Parent range: Pir Panjal Range

Climbing
- First ascent: 1952, Dr. J. de V. Graaff and party

Deo Tibba is a mountain located in Kullu district, Himachal Pradesh, India at a height of 6001 metres. It is situated in the Pir Panjal Range of mountains. It lies to the southwest of Manali above Jagatsukh village. The first reconnaissance of Deo Tibba was made by General Bruce's guide, Furrer, who reported that one of its ridges looked climbable from the Hampta nala. The first acsent was made via the NW Ridge from the Duhangan col between Deo Tibba and Indrasan, in 1952 by Dr. J. de V. Graaff with his wife Clare (the daughter of Sir George Paget Thomson) and Pasang Dawa Lama.

The route to the summit of this peak has a challenging terrain- a climber has to cross over steep ice passes, glaciers with crevasses, rock fall area and moraine. The peak is exceptional in a way that the summit is not a pointed ridge but a snow dome just like an ice cap, with a flat summit plateau. It requires a load ferry, crossing technical terrain difficulties, using fixed ropes, crampons, ice axe etc. It is sometimes misunderstood as a beginner's peak for aspiring mountaineers as it relatively low when compared to Stok Kangri, but is less often climbed. Local and international teams attempt this peak often alongside Mt. Indrasan (6221 m), the two being connected via the high Duhangan Col. by

According to local folklore, derived from Hindu mythology, the dome-shaped peak of Deo Tibba is the seat or assembly place of the gods, much as Mount Olympus was to the Ancient Greeks, with the association being enshrined in its name, being composed of the elements Deo meaning ‘Gods’ and Tibba meaning ‘hill'.
