= Ruskin School of Art =

Art school at the University of Oxford, England

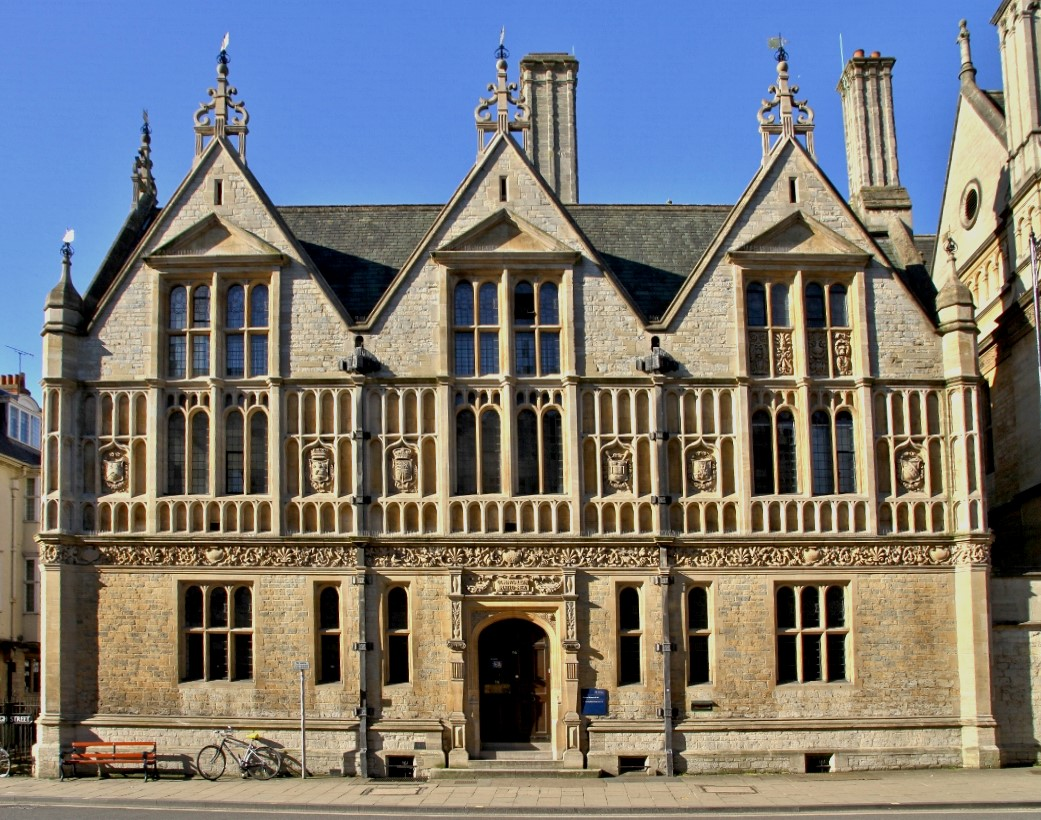
- Ruskin School of Art
- Former name: The Ruskin School of Drawing
- Established: 1871
- Location: Oxford, Oxfordshire, England, United Kingdom; 51°45′09″N 1°15′02″W
- Operating agency: University of Oxford
- Website: www.rsa.ox.ac.uk
- Location within Oxford city centre

The Ruskin School of Art (RSA) is the academic department for fine arts at the Humanities Division at the University of Oxford in Oxford, England, United Kingdom.

== History ==
The Ruskin School of Art grew out the Oxford School of Art, which was founded in 1865 and later became Oxford Brookes University. It was headed by Alexander Macdonald and housed in the University Galleries (subsequently the Ashmolean Museum of Art and Archaeology).

In 1869 John Ruskin was appointed Slade Professor of Fine Art at Oxford. Critical of the teaching methods at the Oxford School of Art, he set out to found the Ruskin School of Drawing in 1871 in the same, but restructured, premises. Macdonald was retained as its Head and became, therefore, the first Ruskin Master until his death in 1921.

The Slade School of Fine Art relocated to the Ruskin for the duration of the Second World War.

It was renamed Ruskin School of Drawing and Fine Art in 1945, and later Ruskin School of Art in 2014. Ruskin School of Art remained at the Ashmolean until 1975 when it moved to 74 High Street. In October 2015, the Ruskin opened a second Fine Art building in East Oxford, at 128 Bullingdon Road, on the site of a former warehouse and annexe. Designed by Spratley Studios Architects, the building houses purpose-built art-facilities and studios, and won a RIBA award in 2015. The Ruskin now operates across both sites.

== Education ==
The School was originally founded to encourage artisanship and technical skills. It now provides undergraduate and postgraduate qualifications in the production and study of visual art. The subject is taught as a living element of contemporary culture with a broad range of historical and theoretical references. The Ruskin remains at the top of the league tables among art schools in the UK, and was top of its category in the 2021 REF (Research Excellence Framework) exercise.

== Ruskin Masters ==
The School was traditionally headed by an appointed Ruskin Master. Richard Wentworth was the last to hold this position (2002–2010). The School now benefits from rotating the post of Head of School amongst current faculty members. At present, the role is with Professor Ian Kiaer, while previous Heads of School have included Professors Michael Archer, Jason Gaiger, Hanneke Grootenboer, Brian Catling, Anthony Gardner and Kristen Kreider.

Ruskin Masters:

- Richard Wentworth 2002–2010
- Stephen Farthing 1990–2000
- David Tindle 1985–1987
- Philip Morsberger 1971–1984
- Richard Naish 1964–1971
- Percy Horton 1949–1964
- Albert Rutherston 1929–1949
- Sydney Carline 1922–1929
- Alexander Macdonald 1871–1922
