= Mane villages, Spiti =

Twin villages in Spiti valley, Himachal Pradesh, India

Mane villages, Spiti Mane Kogma & Mane Yogma
- twin villages
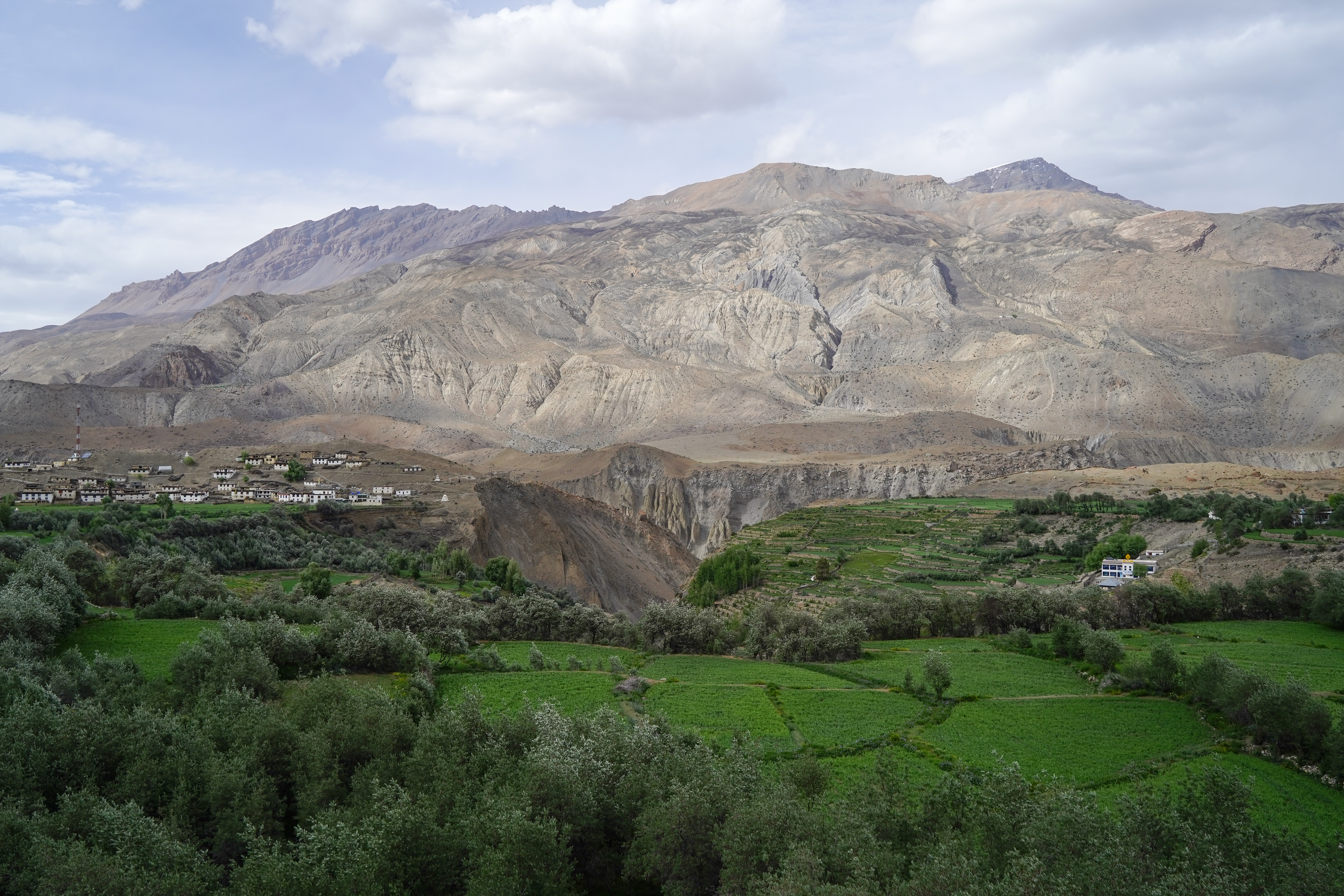
- Mane Gogma (left) & Mane Yogma (right), ca. Jun '18

- Location in Himachal Pradesh, India
- Coordinates: 31.9591°N 78.03254°E
- Country: India
- State: Himachal Pradesh

Government
  - Type: Panchayat
  - Body: Gram Panchayat, Dankhar

Area
  - Total: 0.776 km^{2} (0.300 sq mi)

Population (2011)
  - Total: 440
  - Density: 570/km^{2} (1,500/sq mi)
- Time zone: UTC+5:30 (IST)
- Postal code: 172113
- Website: https://hplahaulspiti.nic.in/

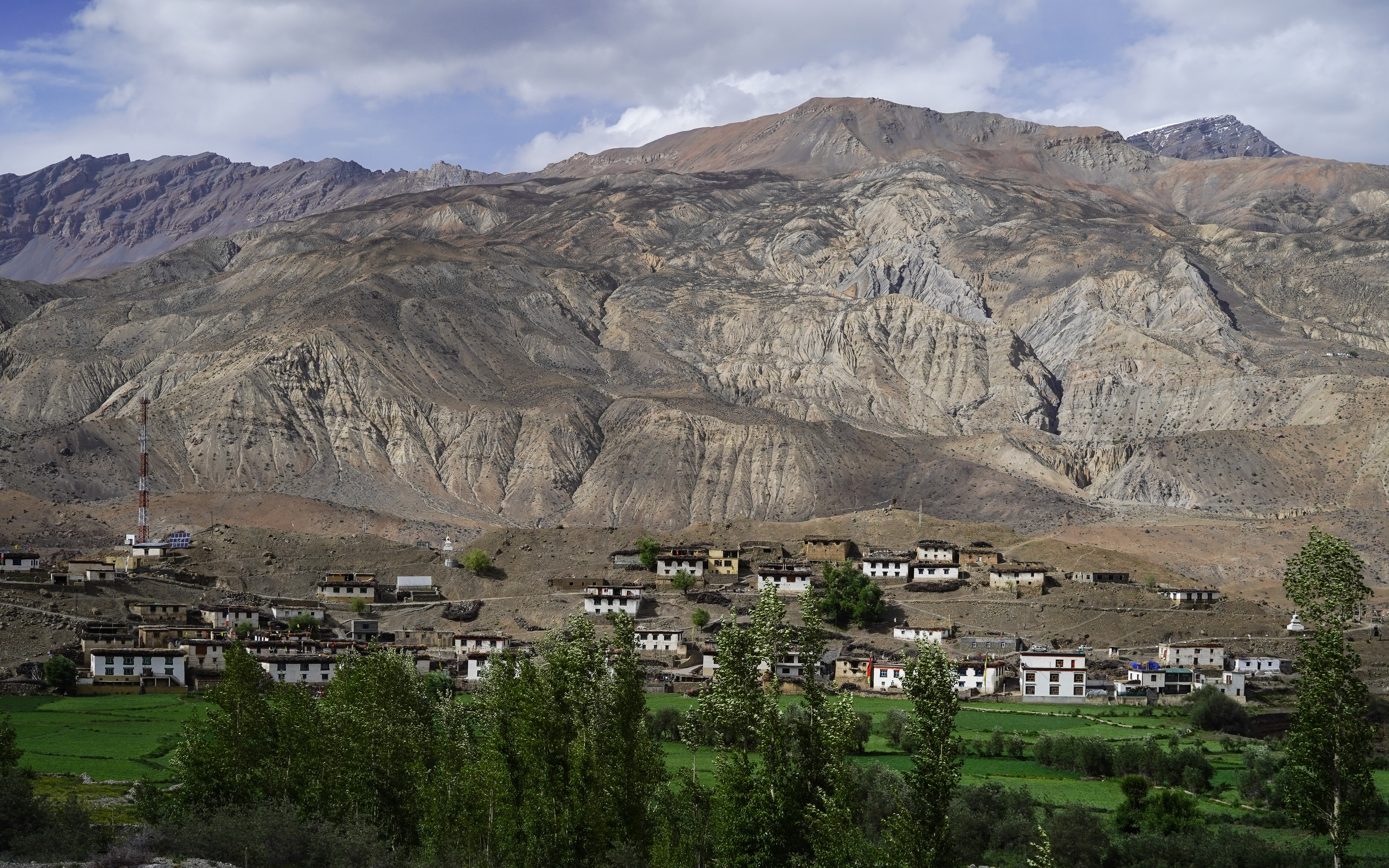
Mane Kogma, ca. Jun '18

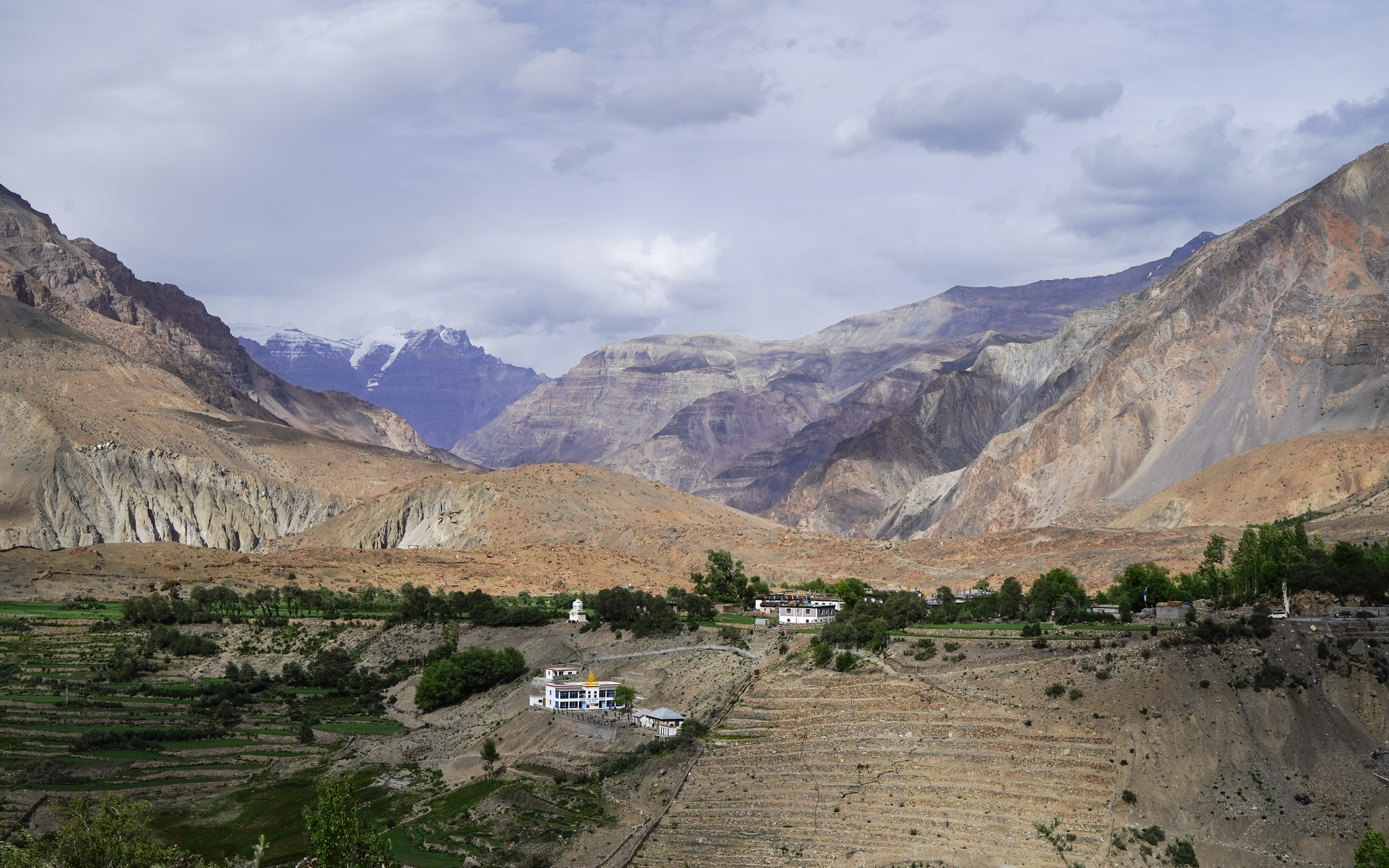
Mane Yogma, ca. Jun '18

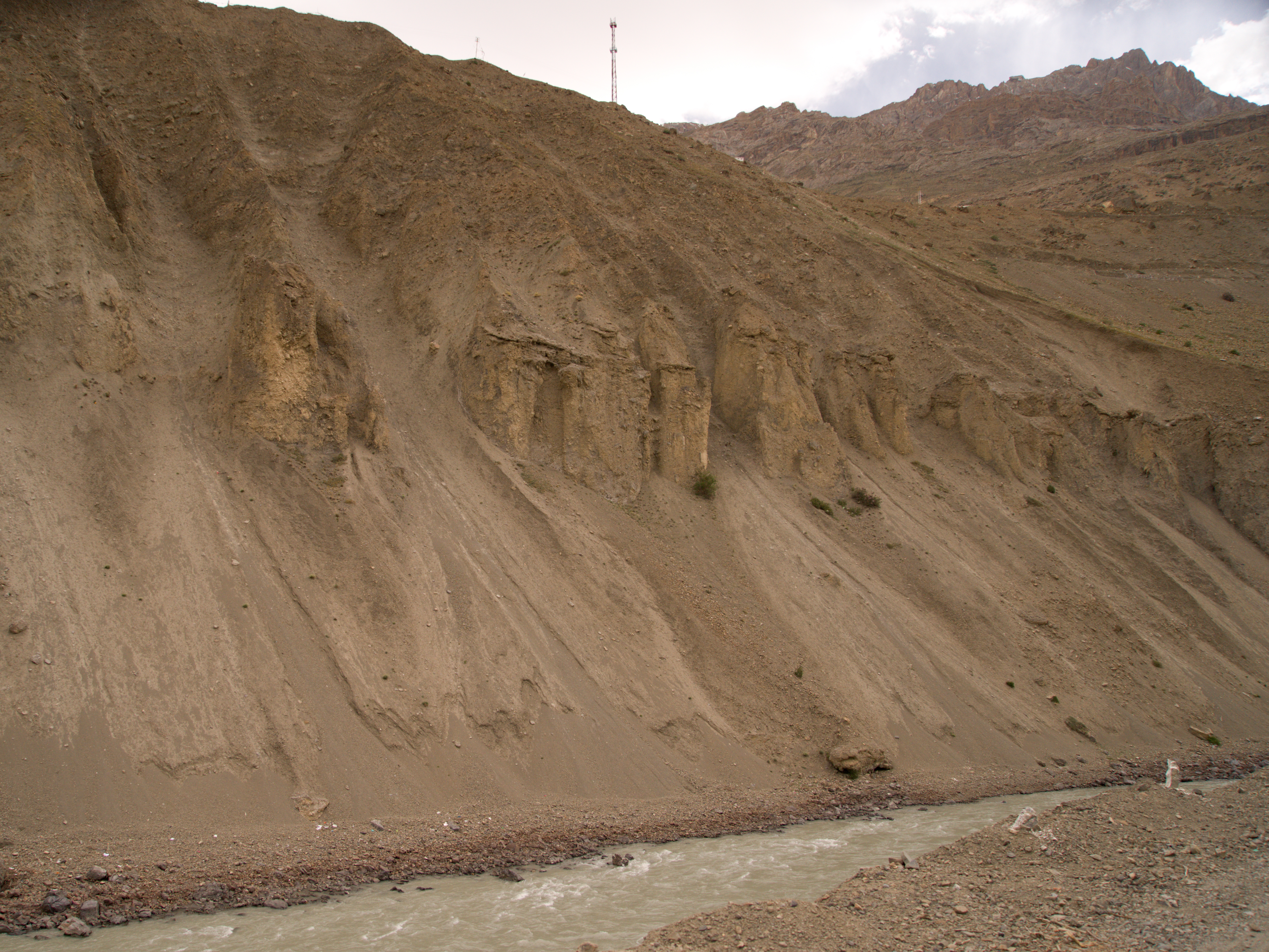
Steep, barren slope from Spiti river to Mane

Mane Kogma and Mane Yogma (also known as Mane Gogma/Gongma, Mane Yongma) are two small villages on opposite banks of a nullah in the cold desert region of Spiti in Himachal Pradesh, India. The villages, at an altitude of 3,650 m (11,980 ft), are located on a small plateau about 200 m (660 ft) above the right bank of the Spiti River. Due to the lush green fields visible only after climbing the barren slope, the villages are referred to as the "hidden treasure".

Mane is the base for trekking and mountaineering in the towering Manirang range that runs between Spiti and Kinnaur. Mane Yogma is the last village in Spiti on the trail over the Manirang Pass to Kinnaur.

== History ==
As far back as 1994 when Indian mountaineer Harish Kapadia and his team passed through on an ascent of Manirang peak, they found the twin villages of Mane Kogma and Mane Yogma. Reportedly, at some time prior, there was one Mane village. It was said to have been destroyed in a flash flood. The village was rebuilt in two sections: Mane Kogma or lower village on the left bank of the nullah, and Mane Yogma or upper village on the right bank.

== Geography ==
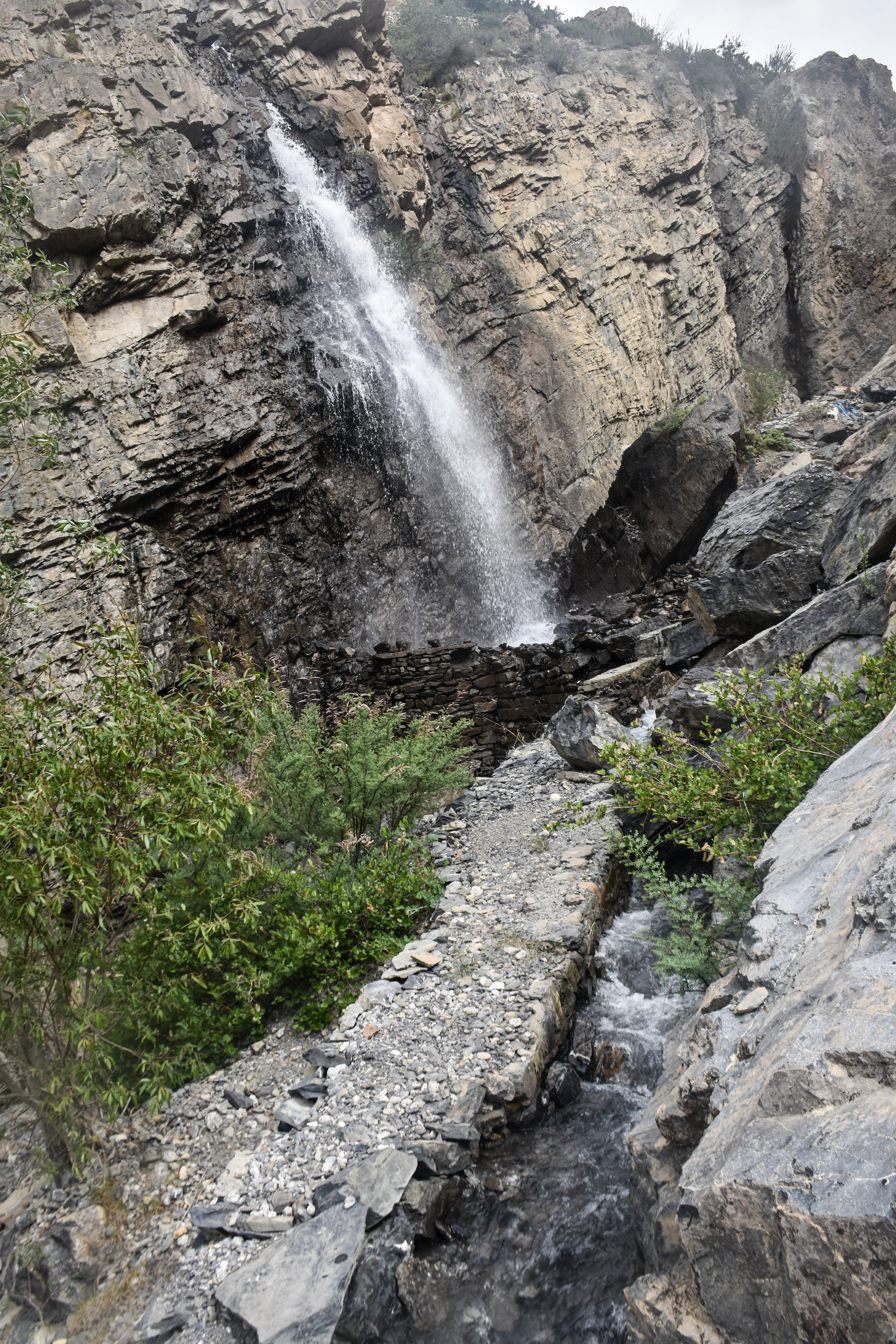
Waterfall and irrigation canal

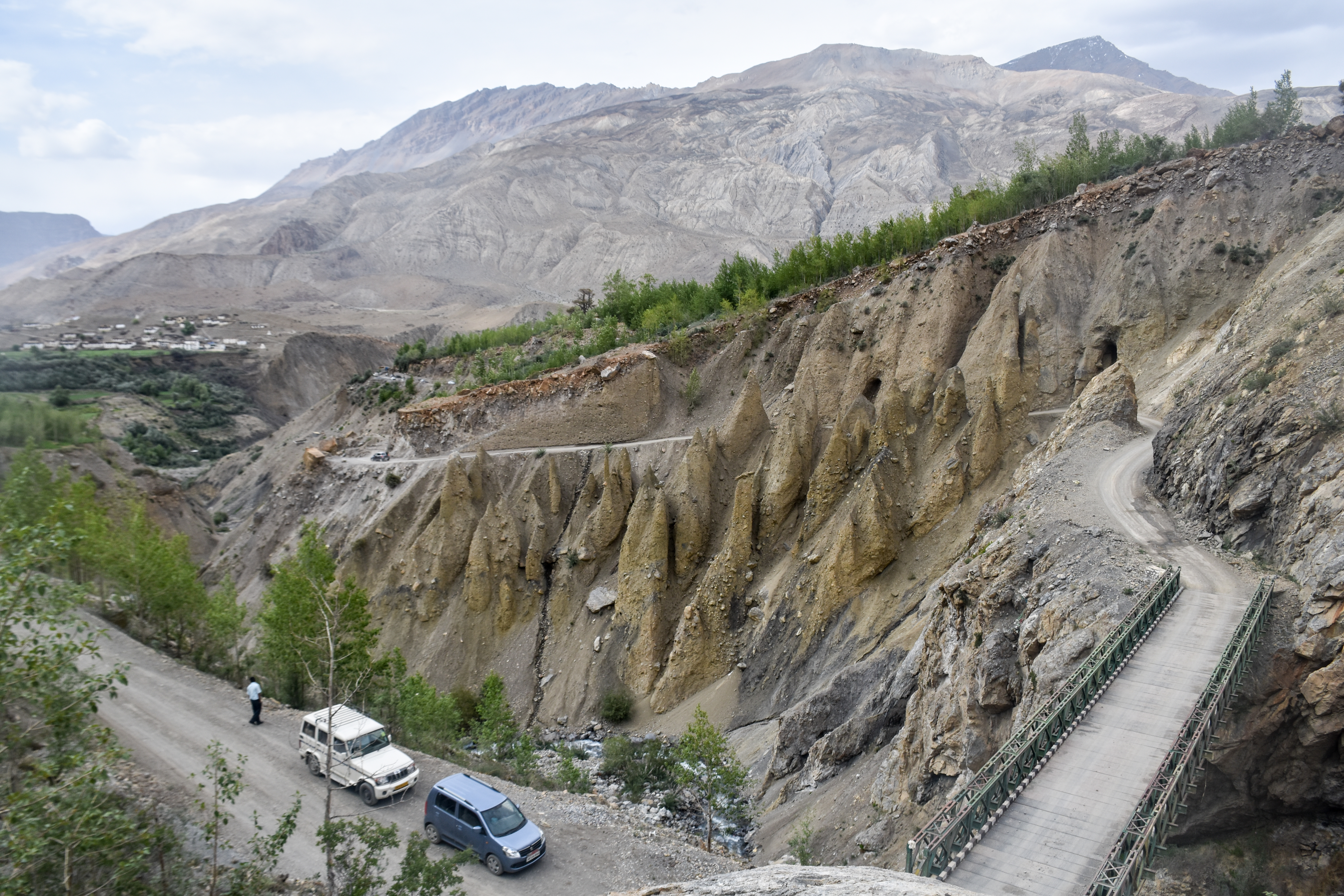
Bridge connecting the two villages

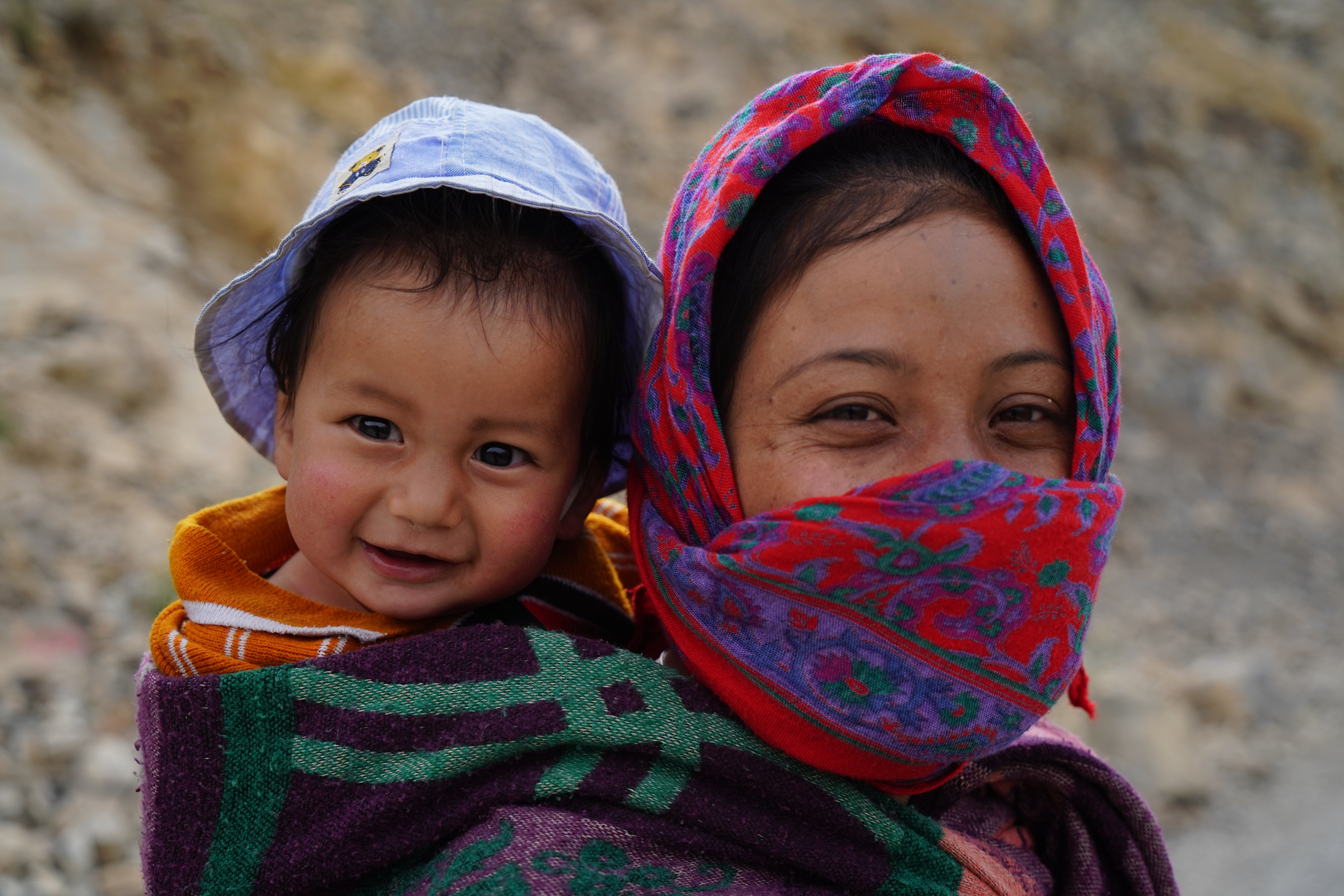
Woman and child

The two Mane villages are located at an altitude of 3,560 m (11,680 ft) on a small plateau about 200 m (660 ft) above the right bank of the Spiti River. While the road up from Spiti traverses a barren rock-strewn slope devoid of vegetation, on reaching the plateau, the traveler is greeted by the sight of lush green fields irrigated by a nullah. The first or lower village on the road from the Spiti valley is Mane Kogma on the left bank of the nullah. The second or upper village at the end of the road is Mane Yogma on the right bank of the nullah. The straight line distance between the two villages is 1 km (0.62 mi) while the road winds along the contours over a distance of 3.3 km (2.1 mi) crossing the nullah via a steel girder bridge.

Himachal is prone to landslides due to the geologically young mountain slopes with loose sedimentary strata. This is compounded by human activity such as terracing and construction of roads and buildings. Residents report that agricultural land is subsiding and some buildings in Mane Yogma near the nullah are developing cracks.

Mane Kogma is 33 kilometres (21 mi) from Kaza, Spiti. This is the route on NH-505 from Manali. From Tabo, en route on NH-505 from Shimla, the distance is 26 km (16 mi). The villages cover an area of 77.6 hectares (192 acres).

Beyond the plateau, the terrain rises steeply to the Manirang range separating Spiti from Kinnaur with peaks between 5,400–6,500 m (17,700–21,300 ft). Southwest of Mane is the 6,593 m (21,631 ft) Manirang peak, one of the highest peaks in the state of Himachal Pradesh. Mane Yogma is the last village in Spiti on the trail to Kinnaur over the 5,550 m (18,210 ft) Manirang Pass. In Spiti, the pass is named Ropak La, after the first village on the Kinnaur side. In Kinnaur, the name is Manirang after the first village on the Spiti side.

== Demographics and amenities ==
Mane consists of two adjacent villages, Mane Kogma and Mane Yogma with a total area of 776 ha (1,920 acres). Information on Mane from the Census of India 2011 is given in the table.

Census 2011 data on Mane Kogma and Mane Yogma
Measure	Mane Kogma	Mane Yogma	Total
Area (ha)	226.7	514.3	776.0
Population	257	183	440
Scheduled Caste	<5%	Nil	
Scheduled Tribes	>75%	>75%	
Households	44	49	93

Mane Kogma and Mane Yogma are villages in the Dhankar Gram Panchayat. Schooling up to senior secondary (Classes 1–12) is available in Mane Yogma, with Mane Kogma having a primary school. As of 2011, the nearest health care was more than 10 km (6.2 mi) away. Piped water supply is available, and the village has power and telephone connections. Mane Kogma has a branch post office. The nearest full-service sub post offices including international speed post are located at Tabo and Kaza, at distances of 26 km (16 mi) and 33 km (21 mi) respectively from Mane Yogma.

The 34th Kalachakra, a periodic Buddhist workshop initiated by the Dalai Lama, was planned to be held in Dhankar Gompa in January 2017. To serve the expected large numbers of monks and tourists from India and abroad, BSNL commissioned a base station tower (BTS) in Mane Gogma to serve Dankhar across the Spiti river. The BTS was linked by satellite and powered by solar panels for uninterrupted telecom service. Although the 34th Kalachakra was subsequently held in Bodh Gaya, this plan gave a fillip to telecom service in the Mane villages and the surrounding areas.

== Places of interest ==
The main attractions of the Mane villages are trekking, views of the surrounding mountains and valleys, and the solitude of village life. Mane Yogma has a Buddhist Gompa. Due to the high altitude and the absence of artificial lights, the nights afford good views of the stars.

Sopona Lake (formerly Yangcho Lake) is a 4 km (2.5 mi) hike up a stream from Mane Yogma. The lake, at an altitude of 4,080 m (13,390 ft), is located on the approximately 18 km (11 mi) trek up to the 5,550 m (18,210 ft) Manirang Pass. The route up to the pass is rated as easy. On the other side, a steep trail descends through the Ropa valley of Kinnaur. From Manirang Pass, mountaineers can attempt to climb the 6,593 m (21,631 ft) Manirang Peak, one of the highest mountains in Himachal Pradesh.

== Accommodation ==
There are a few home stays and camp grounds in Mane Yogma.

== Gallery ==
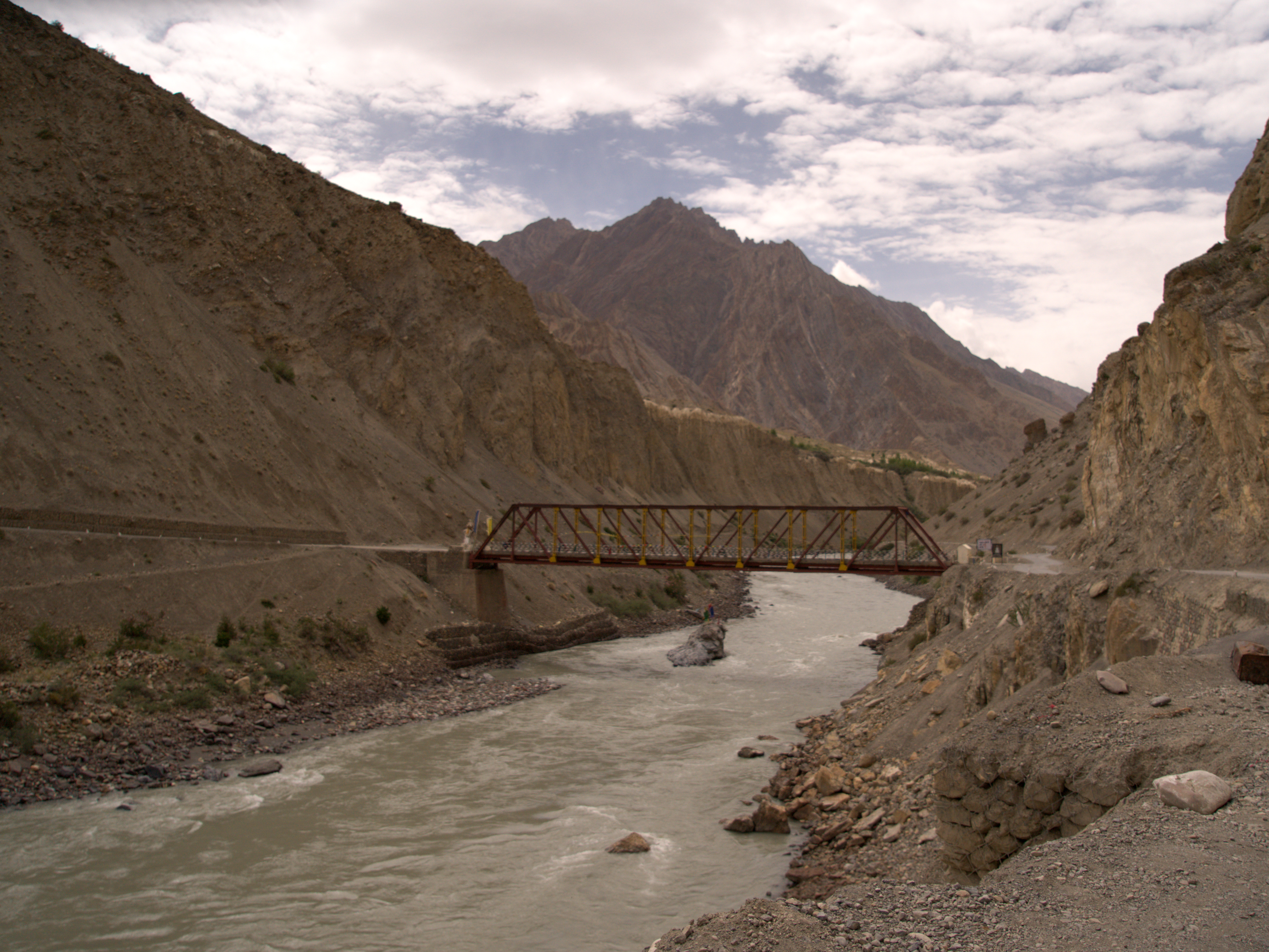
Atergu bridge to Mane, on NH-505

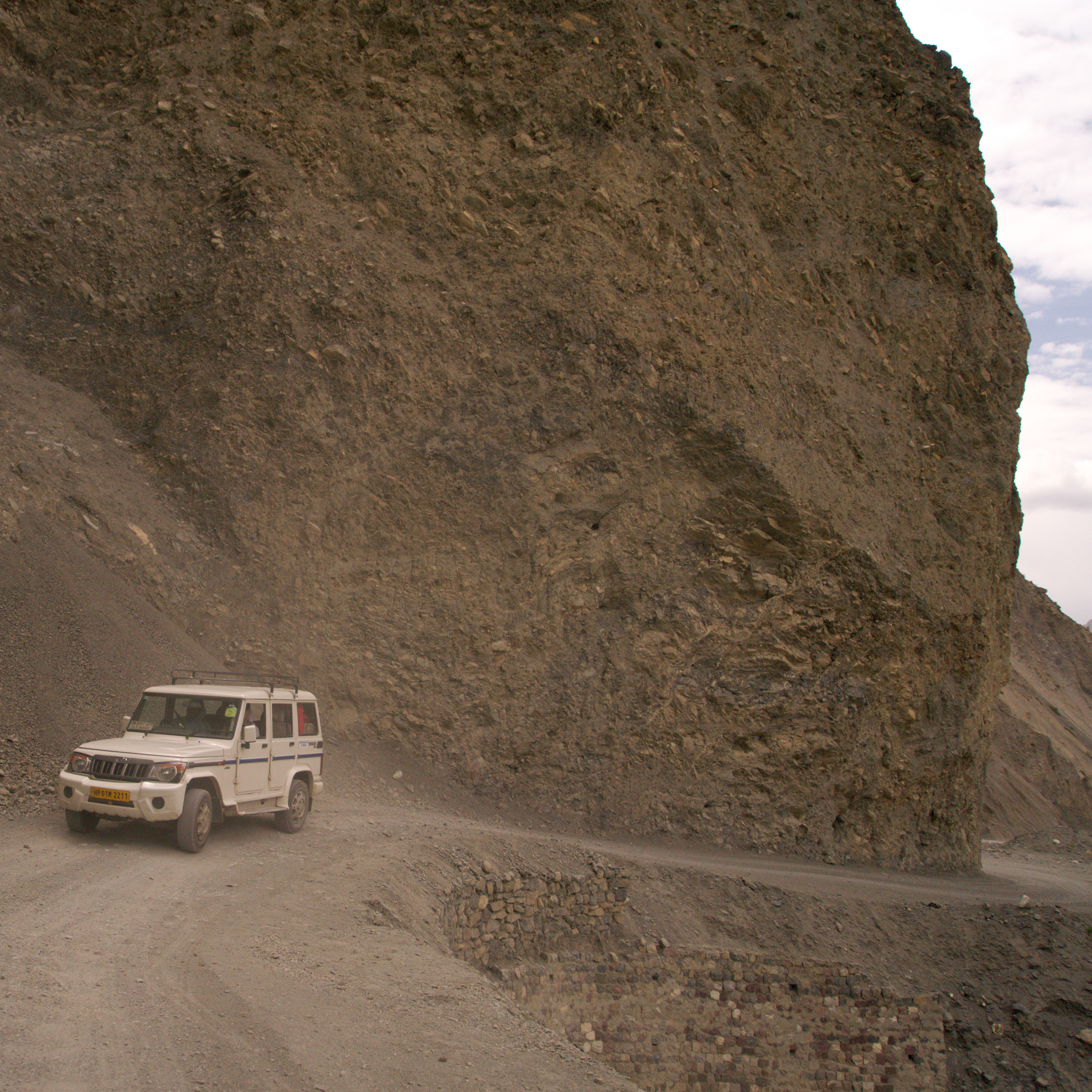
Road from Spiti to Mane, ca. Jun '18

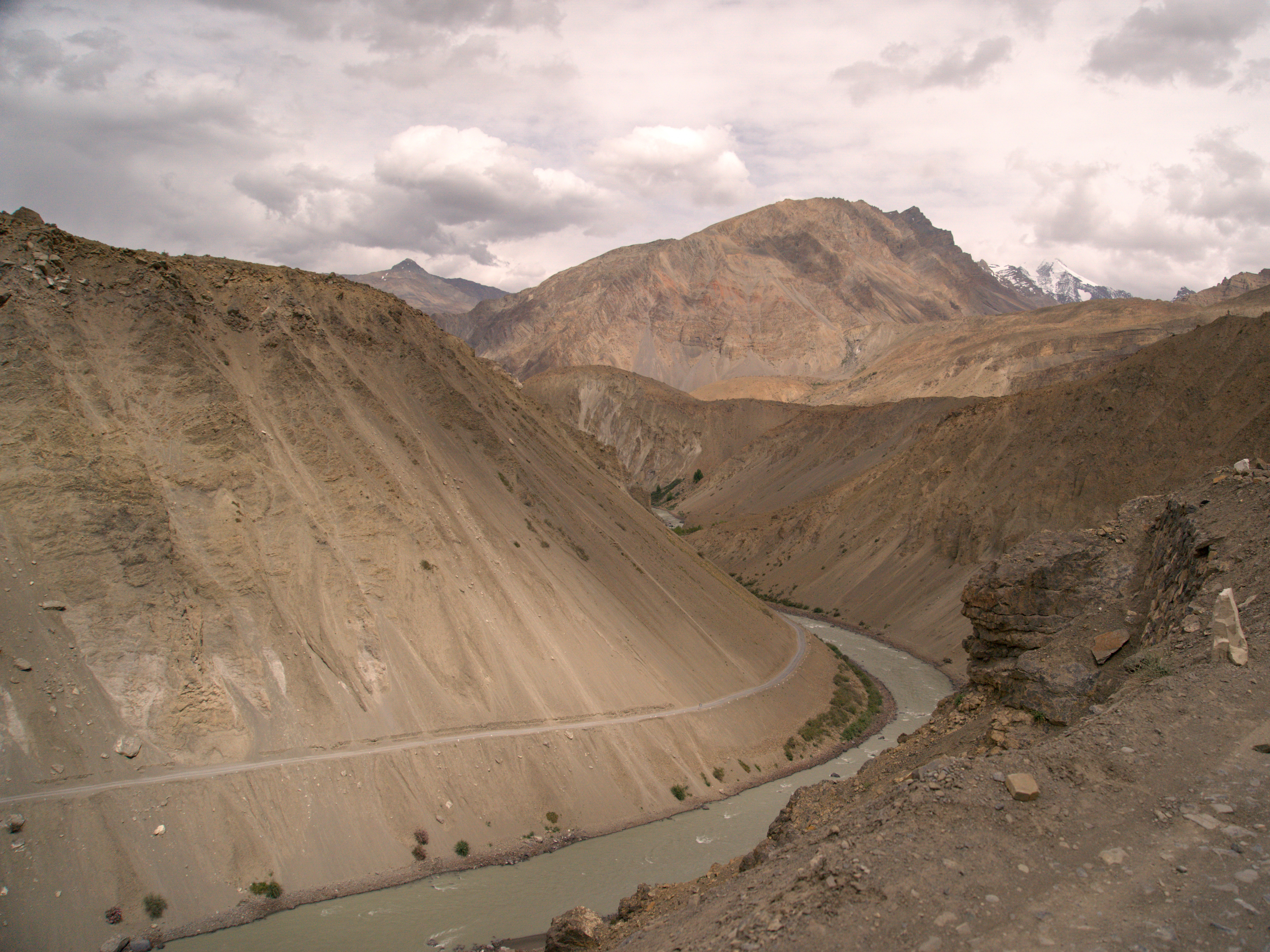
Spiti River from Mane road

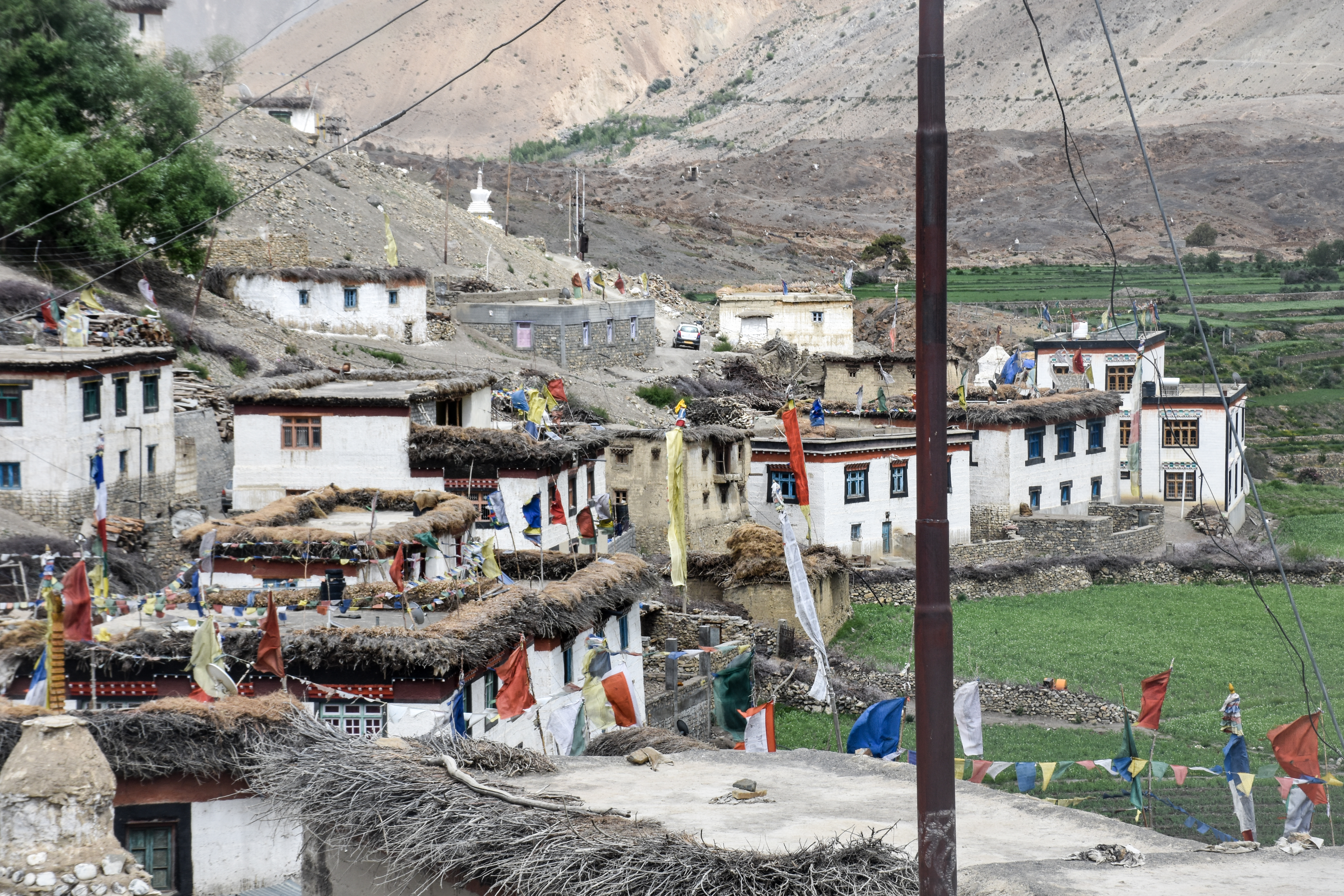
Mane Kogma houses and fields

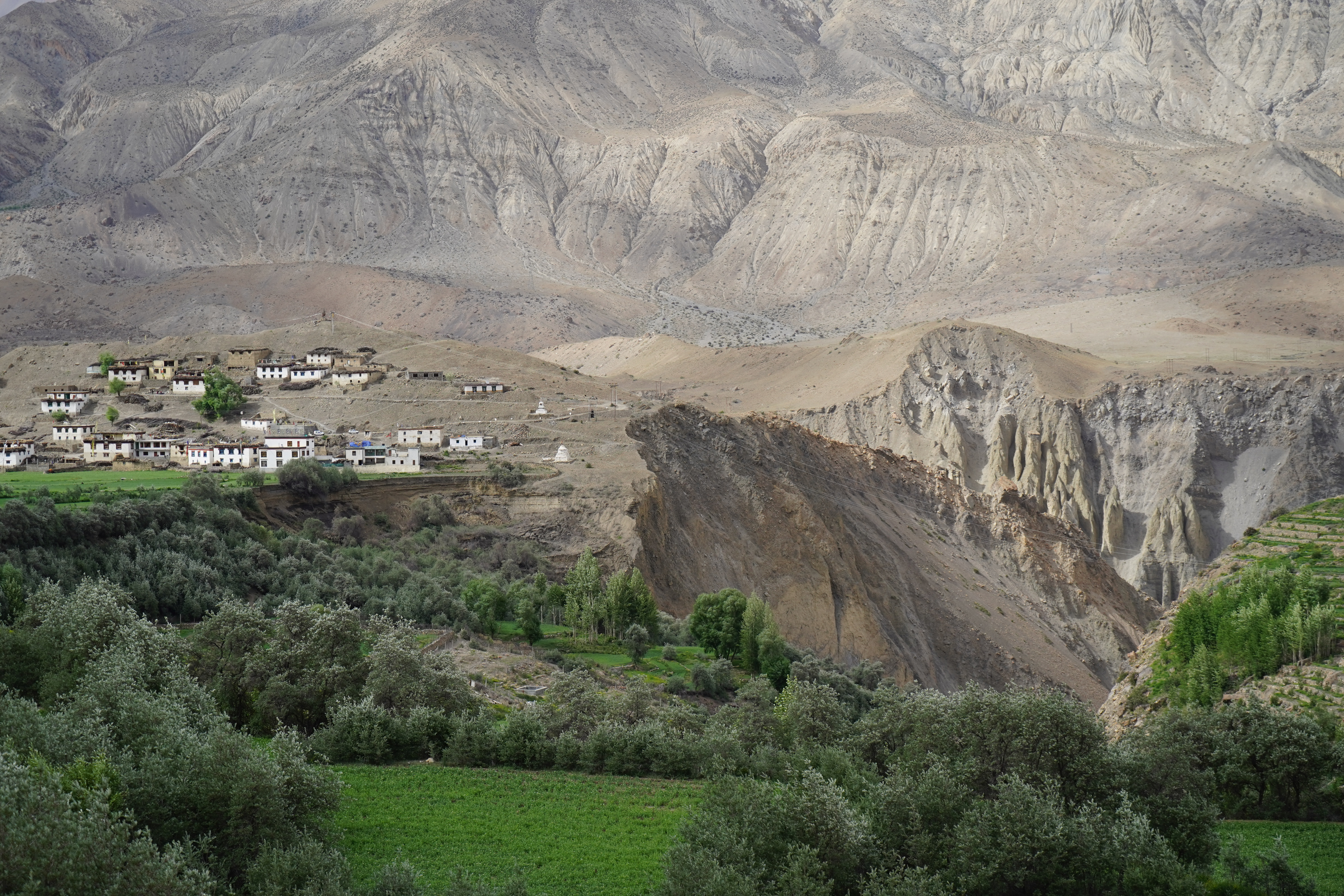
Mane Kogma in danger of landslides

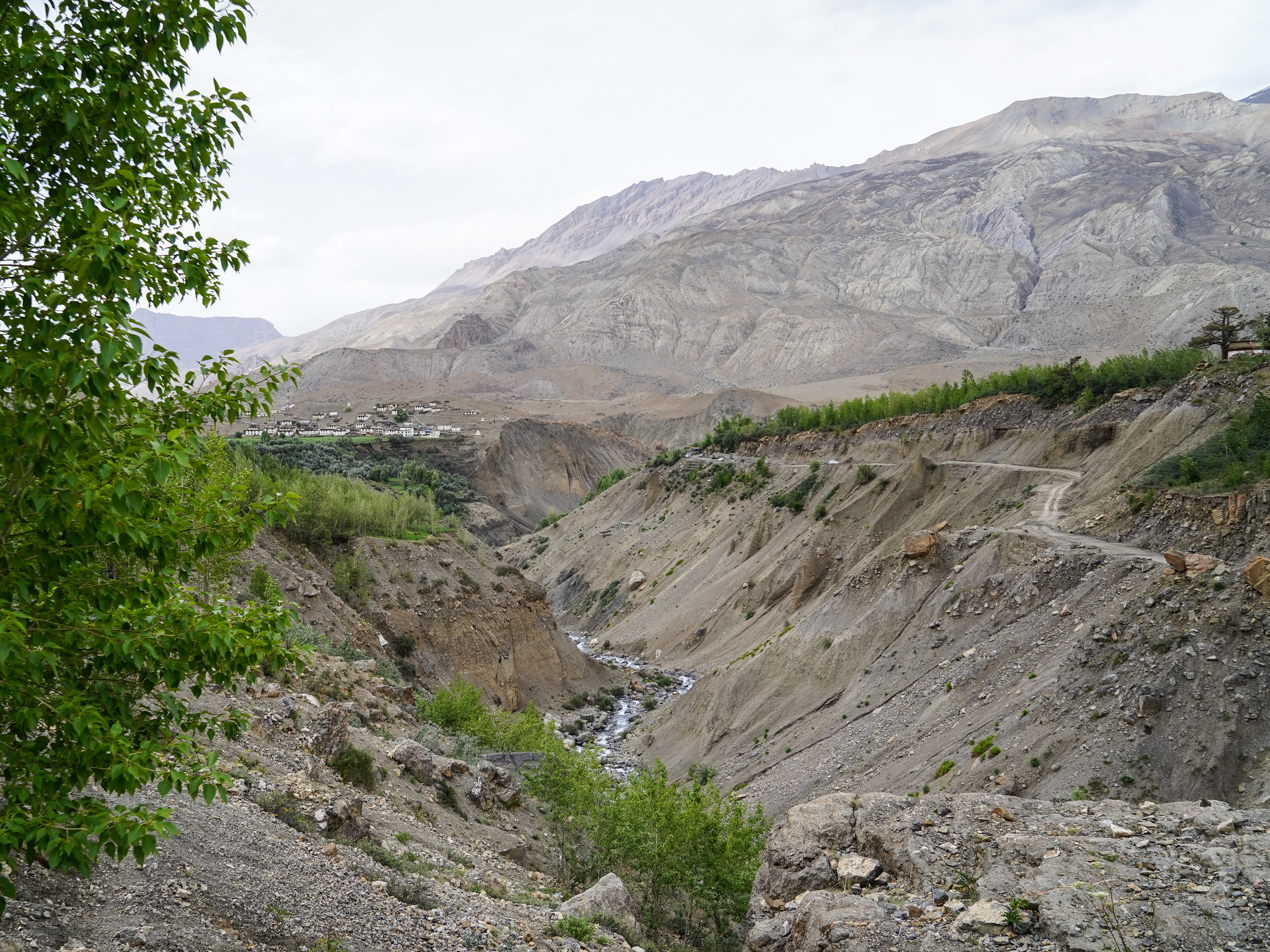
Nullah between the villages

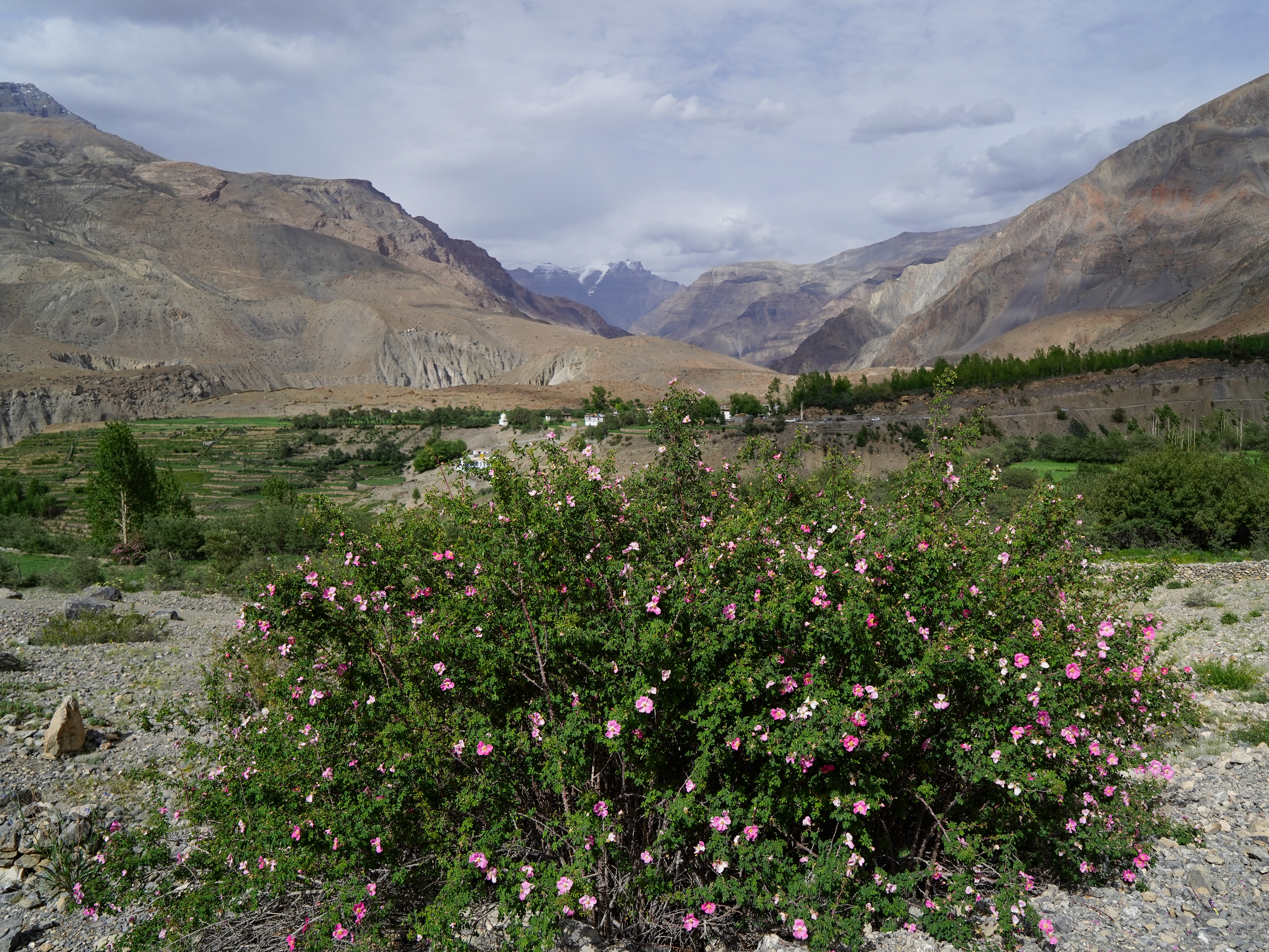
Wild roses in rocky terrain

== See also ==
- Spiti Valley
