= Manirang =

Indian mountain, part of the Himalayas

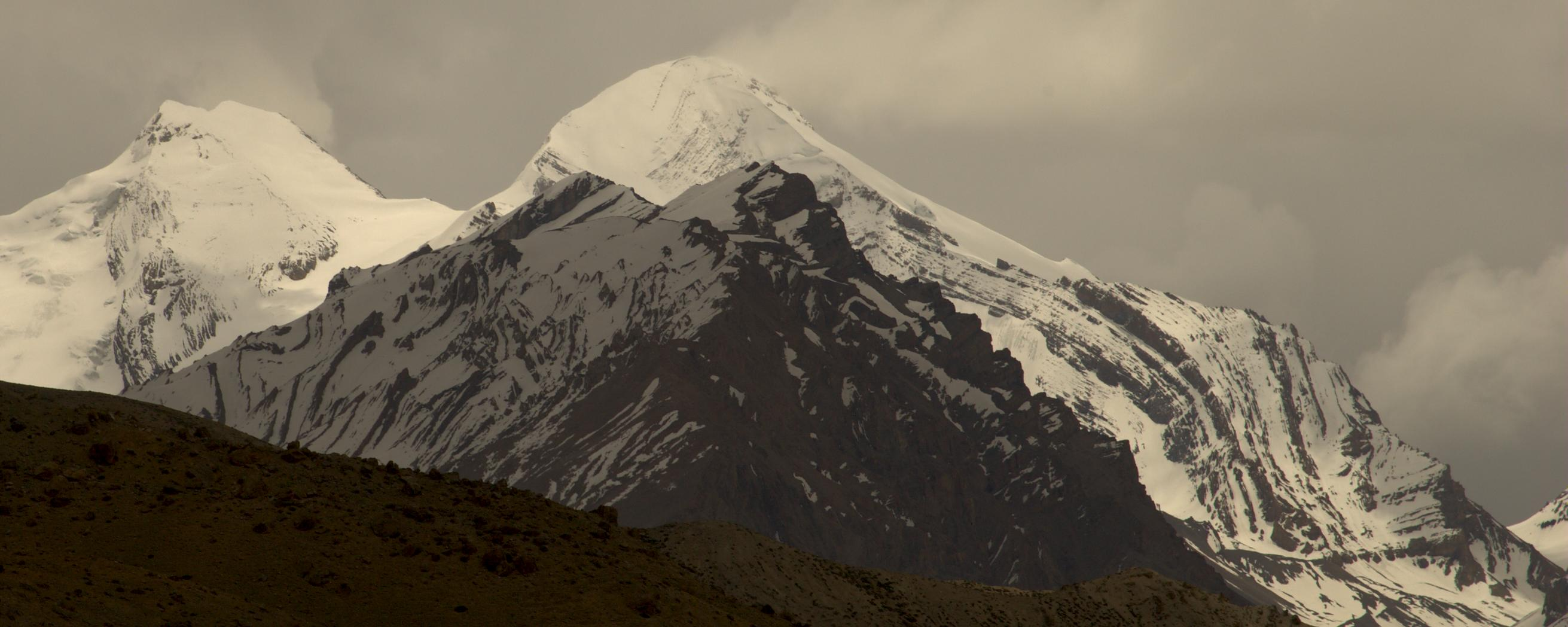
- Manirang peak from NW direction

Highest point
- Elevation: 6,593 m (21,631 ft)
- Prominence: 1,727 m (5,666 ft)
- Listing: Ultra
- Coordinates: 31°57′12″N 78°22′00″E

Geography
- Location within Himachal Pradesh Location within India
- Location: Himachal Pradesh, India
- Parent range: Himalaya

Climbing
- First ascent: 1952, Dr. J. de V. Graaff and party

Manirang is one of the highest mountains in the Indian state Himachal Pradesh. It lies on the border between Kinnaur district and Lahaul and Spiti district. Close to the peak is the high Manirang pass, which was one of the early trade routes between Spiti and Kinnaur, before the motorable road was built. The trail over the pass starts from Mane Yogma on the Spiti side and runs to the Ropa valley in Kinnaur.

The first acsent was made on 12 September 1952 by Dr. J. de V. Graaff, his wife Clare (the daughter of Sir George Paget Thomson) with Pasang Dawa & Tashi Sherpa.

== See also ==
- List of ultras of the Himalayas
