= SA Metal Group =

South African company

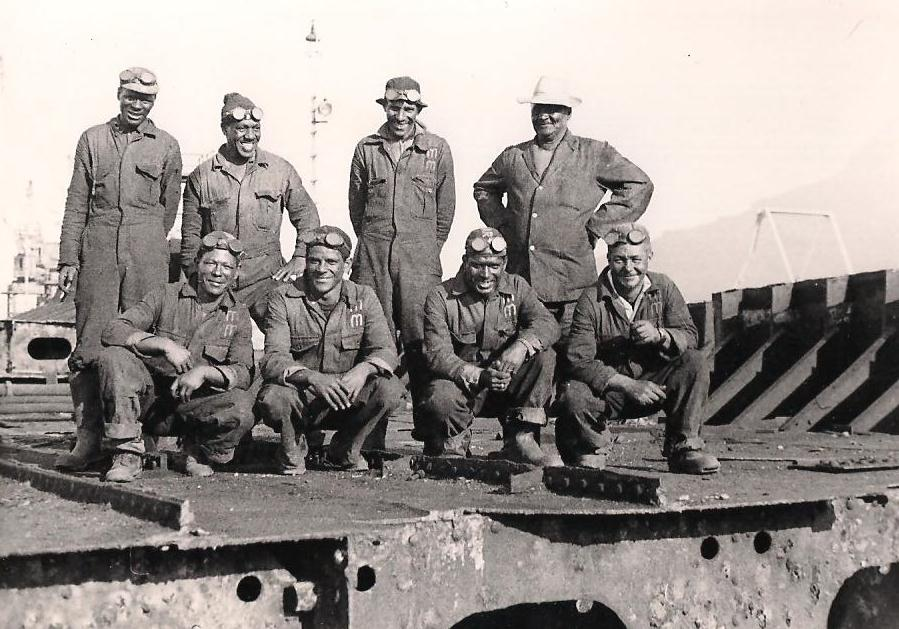
- Company type: Company
- Industry: Metal recycling
- Founded: 1919; 106 years ago
- Founder: Wolfe Barnett
- Headquarters: South Africa

SA Metal Group is South Africa’s oldest and one of its largest metal recycling companies. Founded by Wolfe Barnett (1886–1946) in 1919 it has remained a family business into the fourth generation.

The company operates from over ten sites around South Africa collecting and processing scrap metals. It purchases scrap metals from factories, other industrial companies, dealers and collectors. Hundreds of thousands of people in South Africa make a living collecting and delivering scrap metal to companies like SA Metal Group.

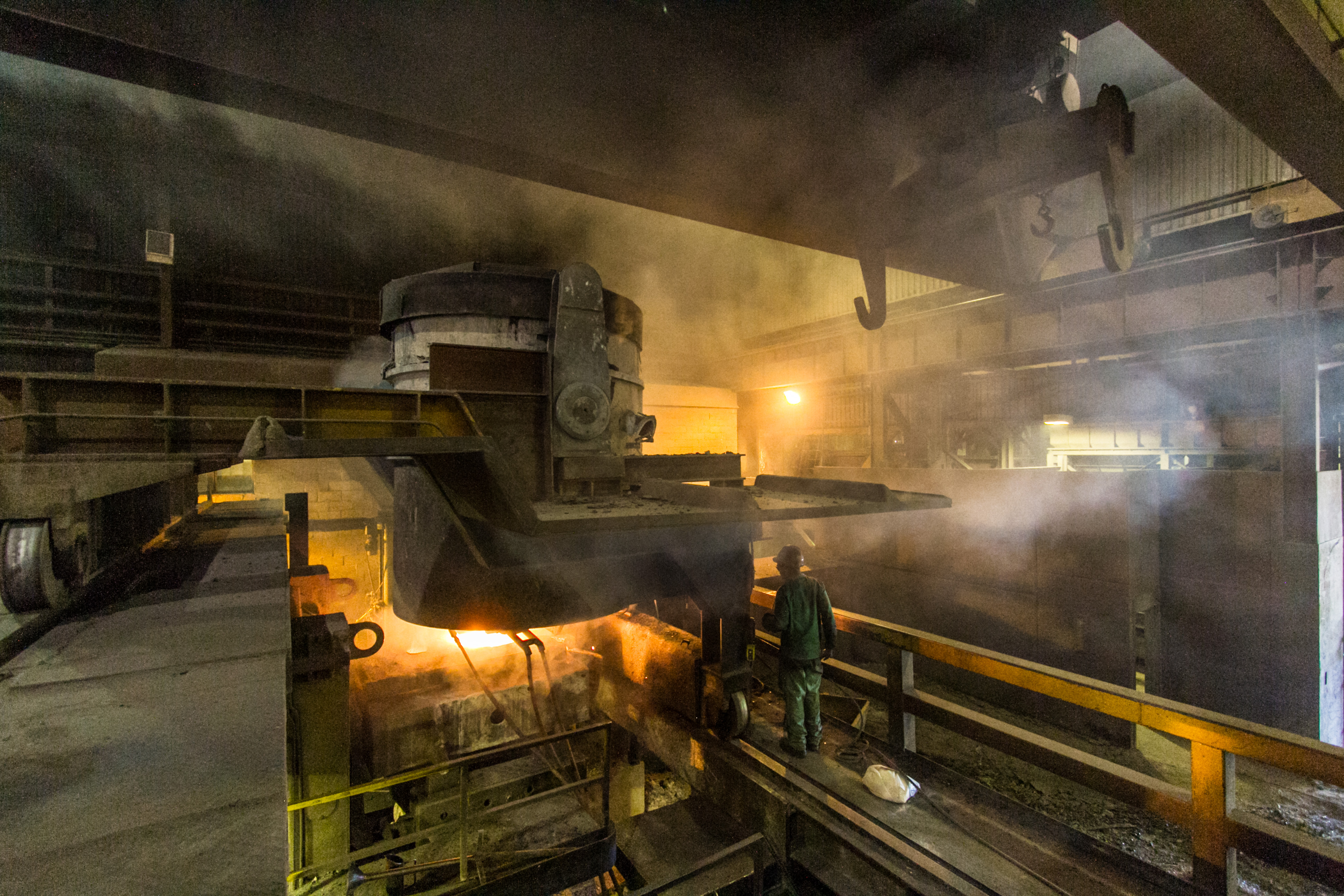
Recycled steel scrap is melted down in electric induction furnaces before being converted into steel products

The company also undertakes heavy demolition and rehabilitation work on the many mines in South Africa which have closed down and must be safely restored to the original condition of the environment. Scrap metals recovered from such demolition are also sent to the company’s processing yards.

Processed scrap metal is delivered to steel mills and foundries or exported if there is insufficient local demand.

The company also operates its own steel mill in Cape Town manufacturing high-specification steel reinforcing bar for the local construction industry.

In 1970, the restored body of a World War II Spitfire aircraft was mounted at the company’s Salt River, Cape Town premises where it became a world-famous landmark. In 1988, the Spitfire had to be removed due to deterioration from nearby railway shunting yards and vandals taking shots at it. It was shipped to the UK and sold to a restorer.

The South African government has recently introduced regulations governing the export of scrap metal. It remains to be seen how this will impact on the industry in South Africa.

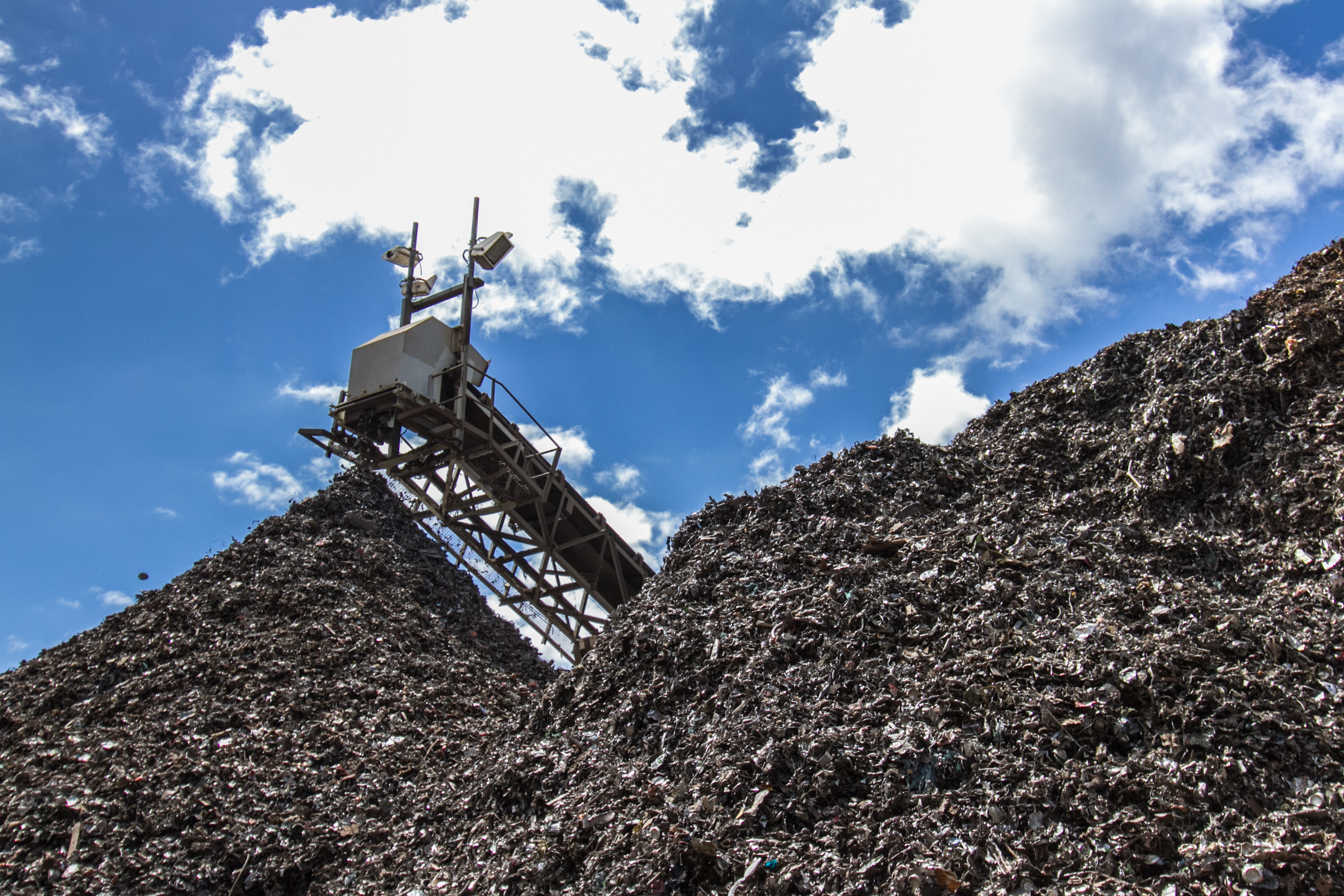
Shredded steel scrap being processed at an SA Metal yard
