= Alexander Macdonald (artist) =

British artist and art educator (1849–1921)

Alexander Macdonald (1849–1921), sometimes erroneously written MacDonald, was a British artist and art educator.

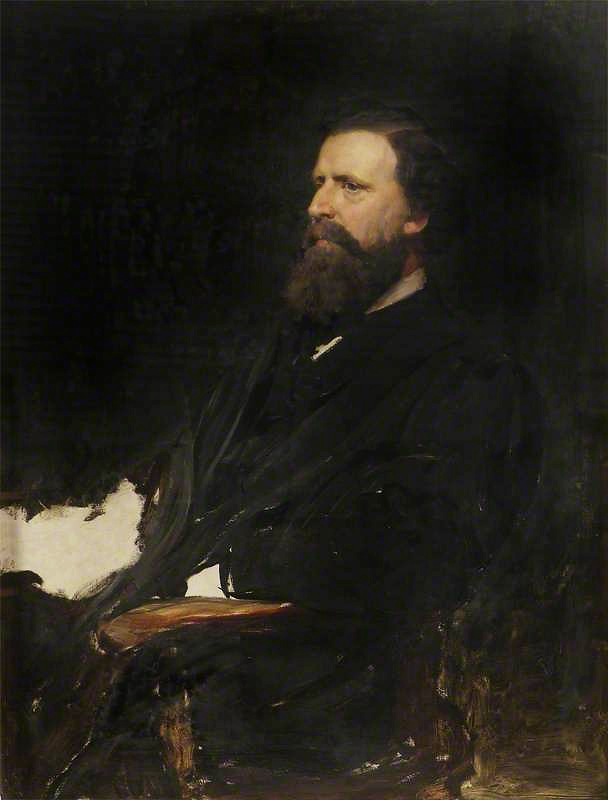
Alexander Macdonald by Hubert von Herkomer (1849–1914)

== Career ==
Macdonald trained at the South Kensington Schools where, in the end, he became an assistant in the studio of the Painting Master Robert Collinson. At the same time, he took on teaching tasks all over London and was from c. 1863-65 in "sole charge of a very large mechanic's class in the east of London."

From its inaugural year 1865 until 1871, Macdonald was Master (principal) of the Oxford School of Art housed in the future Ashmolean Museum. When John Ruskin became Slade Professor at the University of Oxford, he was critical of the teaching methods at the school and in 1871 founded the Ruskin School of Drawing, retaining Macdonald as master. Ruskin, not being able to take all classes, entrusted these to Macdonald, as the first to hold the position of Ruskin Master, a position he held until his death in 1921. Ruskin had, through pressure from the backers of his new school, reluctantly accepted Macdonald, who as Master of the Oxford School of Art taught to the South Kensington system which Ruskin despised, and when as Ruskin Master didn't adhere to Ruskin-ian principles of copying from "stone, leaves and flowers" rather than directly from the life model or En plein air. Ruskin, on retirement as Slade Professor, attempted to have Macdonald removed as Ruskin Master, but this failed because of the support Macdonald received from the governing body of the Ruskin, particularly from Henry Acland and Henry Liddell.

While at the Ruskin School of Drawing Macdonald taught part-time at Radley College and took in private students, this to supplement his salary which was, for twenty years, provided by Ruskin. Between 1890 and 1908 he was Keeper of the Oxford University Galleries.
