= South African Journal of Economics =

Peer-reviewed journal

- Discipline: Economics Development Economics
- Language: English

Publication details
- History: 1933-Present
- Publisher: Wiley-Blackwell on behalf of the Economic Society of South Africa.
- Frequency: Quarterly
- Impact factor: 0.685 (2016)

Standard abbreviations
- ISO 4: S. Afr. J. Econ.

Indexing
- ISSN: 0038-2280 (print); 1813-6982 (web)

Links
- Journal homepage; Online access

South African Journal of Economics is a quarterly peer-reviewed economics journal published by Wiley-Blackwell on behalf of the Economic Society of South Africa (ESSA). The journal was established in 1933. The journal publishes information on economic issues affecting African countries. General topics of focus include health issues, inflation issues, monetary and fiscal policy issues, regulatory issues and information on the South African Political Economy.

According to the Journal Citation Reports, the journal has a 2016 impact factor of 0.685, ranking it 225th out of 347 journals in the category "Economics".

== History ==
During Apartheid the Journal experienced significant challenges to remain viable due to a lack of foreign contributions and emigration of young South African economics graduates.
