= Economic Society of South Africa =

South African discussion forum

Economic Society of South Africa (ESSA), established in 1925 is a "discussion forum" for South African economists in academic life, government and business. It is currently (2024) chaired by Prof. Daniela Casale of the university of the Witwatersrand.

The Society has large and diverse membership. Over the years members have played a major role in applying economic thinking to and analysing South African economic issues . Distinguished members of the Society have included Cabinet Ministers, Governors of the South African Reserve Bank, Chief Executives of Companies, Directors-General of Government Departments, and internationally acclaimed academics.

ESSA publishes the South African Journal of Economics, established in 1933, which is one of the leading international regional journals. The journal covers the discipline in general, including methodology and economic history and, in more recent times, econometrics. Its editorial organisation has recently been extended to allow for a more effective editing of papers on specialised topics.

== See also ==
- Economy of South Africa
- Economic History Society of Southern Africa
- Investment Analysts Society of Southern Africa
