= Economic History of Developing Regions =

- Discipline: Economic history
- Language: English
- Edited by: Alex Klein, Alfonso Herranz-Loncan

Publication details
- Former name: South African Journal of Economic History
- History: 1982-present
- Publisher: Routledge on behalf of the Economic History Society of Southern Africa
- Frequency: Triannually
- Open access: Hybrid

Standard abbreviations
- ISO 4: Econ. Hist. Dev. Reg.

Indexing
- ISSN: 2078-0389 (print); 2078-0397 (web)
- LCCN: 2010250758
- OCLC no.: 949766093
- South African Journal of Economic History
- ISSN: 1011-3436 (print); 2159-0850 (web)

Links
- Journal homepage; Online access; Online archive; Journal page at society website

Economic History of Developing Regions is a triannual peer-reviewed academic journal covering the economic history of the developing world. It was established in 1982 as the South African Journal of Economic History, obtaining its current title in 2010. The journal is published by Routledge on behalf of the Economic History Society of Southern Africa (founded in 1980). The editors are Alfonso Herranz-Loncan (University of Barcelona), Vellore Arthi (University of California-Irvine) and Michiel de Haas (University of Wageningen).

== Abstracting and indexing ==
The journal is abstracted and indexed in:

- EBSCO databases
- Emerging Sources Citation Index
- International Bibliography of the Social Sciences
- Scopus
