= Willem Botha (politician) =

South African politician (born 1943)

Member of the National Assembly
- In office May 1994 – June 1999

Personal details
- Born: Willem Abraham Botha; 21 March 1943 (age 83)
- Citizenship: South Africa
- Party: Freedom Front

Willem Abraham Botha (born 21 March 1943) is a retired South African politician who represented the Freedom Front (FF) in the National Assembly from 1994 to 1999. He was elected in the 1994 general election as one of the party's nine representatives in the assembly.

Though he stood for re-election in 1999, he was ranked sixth on the FF's national party list and therefore failed to gain re-election.
