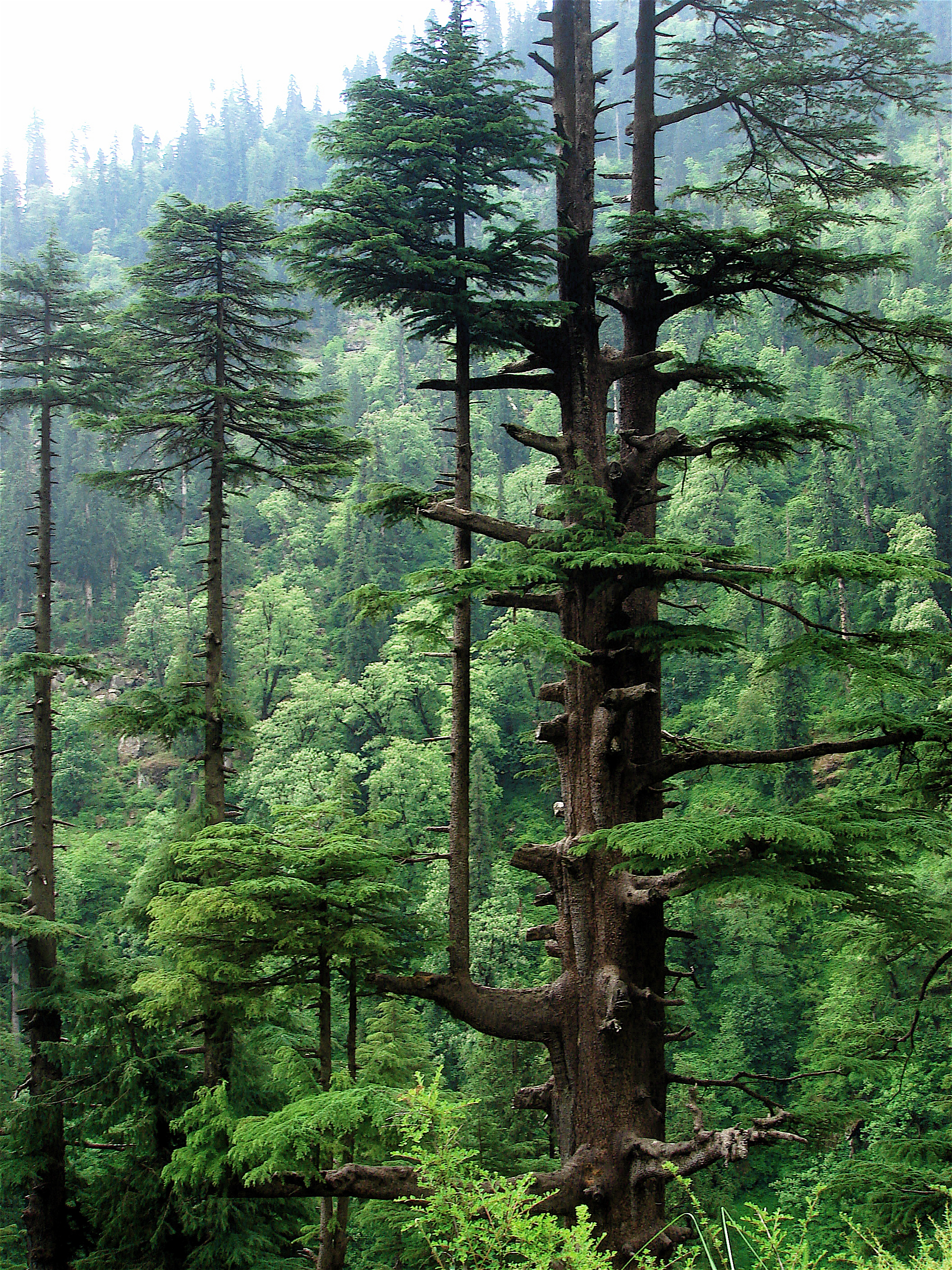
- Adult trees in Himachal Pradesh, India

Conservation status
- Least Concern (IUCN 3.1)

Scientific classification
- Kingdom: Plantae
- Clade: Tracheophytes
- Clade: Gymnosperms
- Division: Pinophyta
- Class: Pinopsida
- Order: Pinales
- Family: Pinaceae
- Genus: Cedrus
- Species: C. deodara

Binomial name
- Cedrus deodara (Roxb.) G.Don

= Cedrus deodara =

Deodar cedar Temporal range: Quaternary–Recent

Species of plant

Cedrus deodara, the deodar cedar, Himalayan cedar, or deodar, is a species of cedar, a conifer in the pine family, Pinaceae, native to the Himalayas.

== Description ==
It is a large coniferous tree reaching 40–50 metres (131–164 feet) tall, exceptionally 60 m (197 ft) with a trunk up to 3 m (10 ft) in diameter. It has a conic crown with level branches and drooping branchlets.

The leaves are needle-like, mostly 2.5–5 centimetres (1–2 inches) long, occasionally up to 7 cm (3 in) long, slender (1 millimetre or 1/32 in thick), borne singly on long shoots, and in dense clusters of 20–30 on short shoots; they vary from bright green to glaucous blue-green in colour. The female cones are barrel-shaped, 7–13 cm (2 3/4–5 in) long and 5–9 cm (2–3 1/2 in) broad, and disintegrate when mature (in 12 months) to release the winged seeds. The male cones are 4–6 cm (1 1/2–2 1/4 in) long, and shed their pollen in autumn.

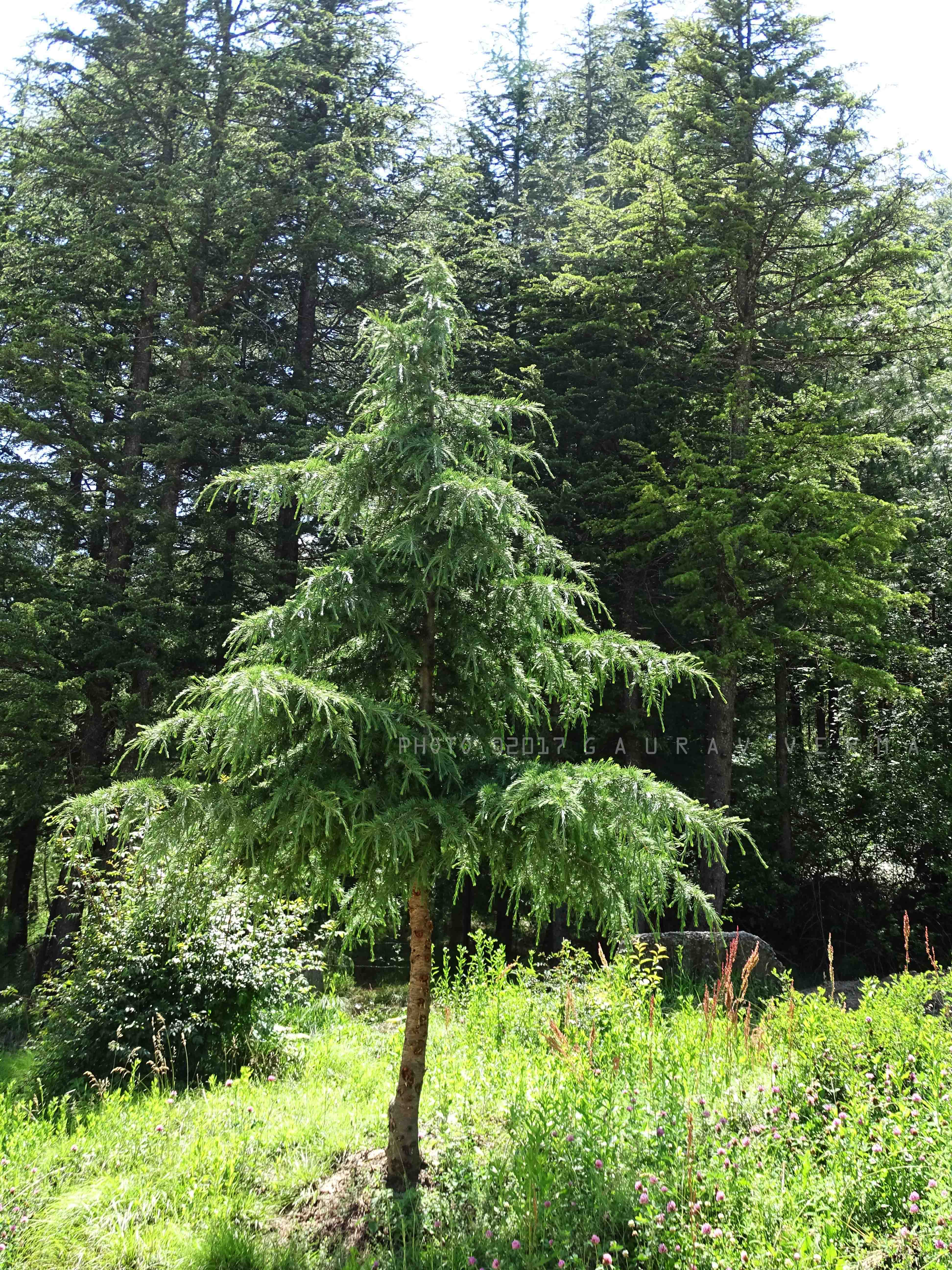
Young tree in India

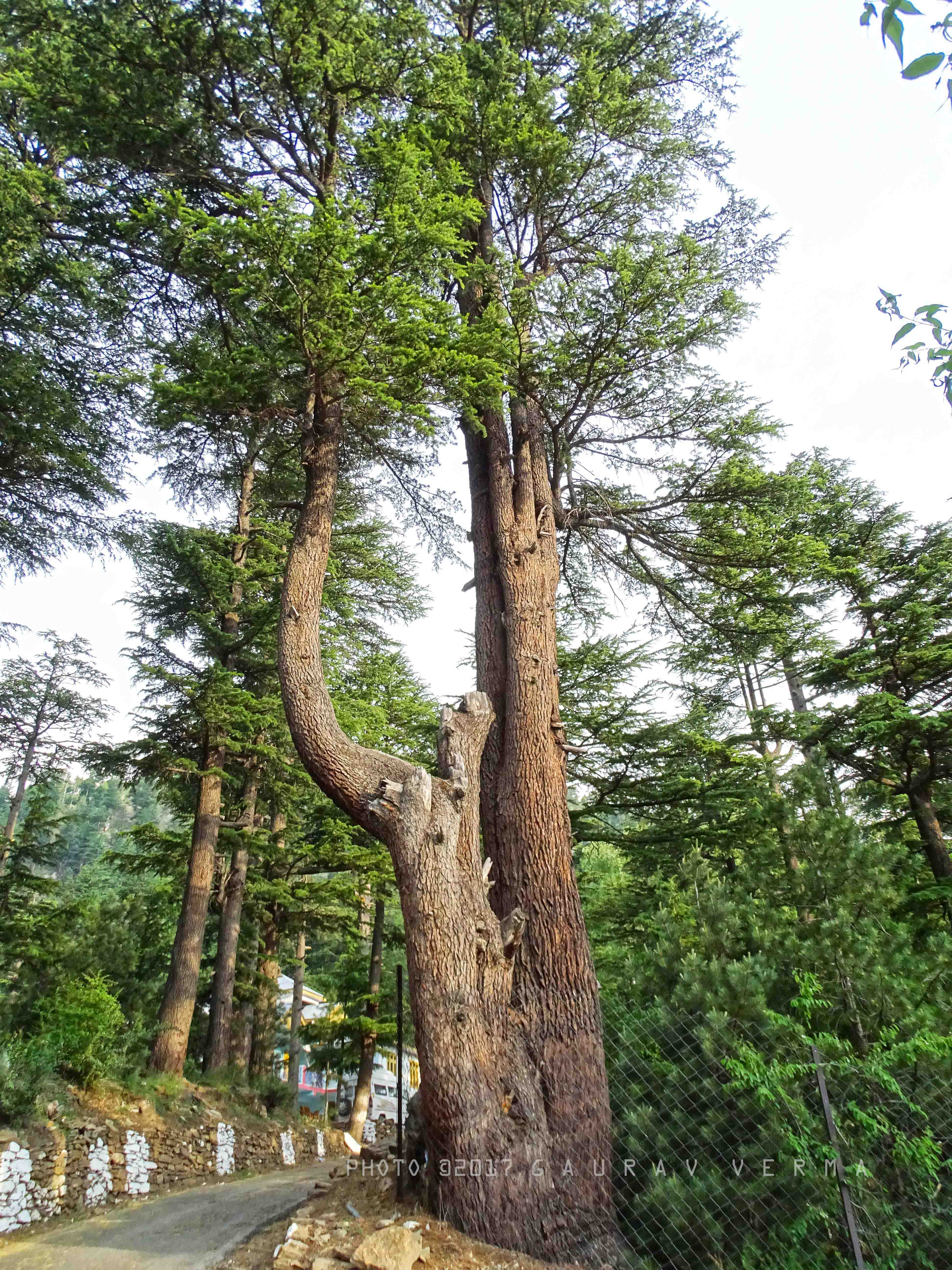
Older tree in India

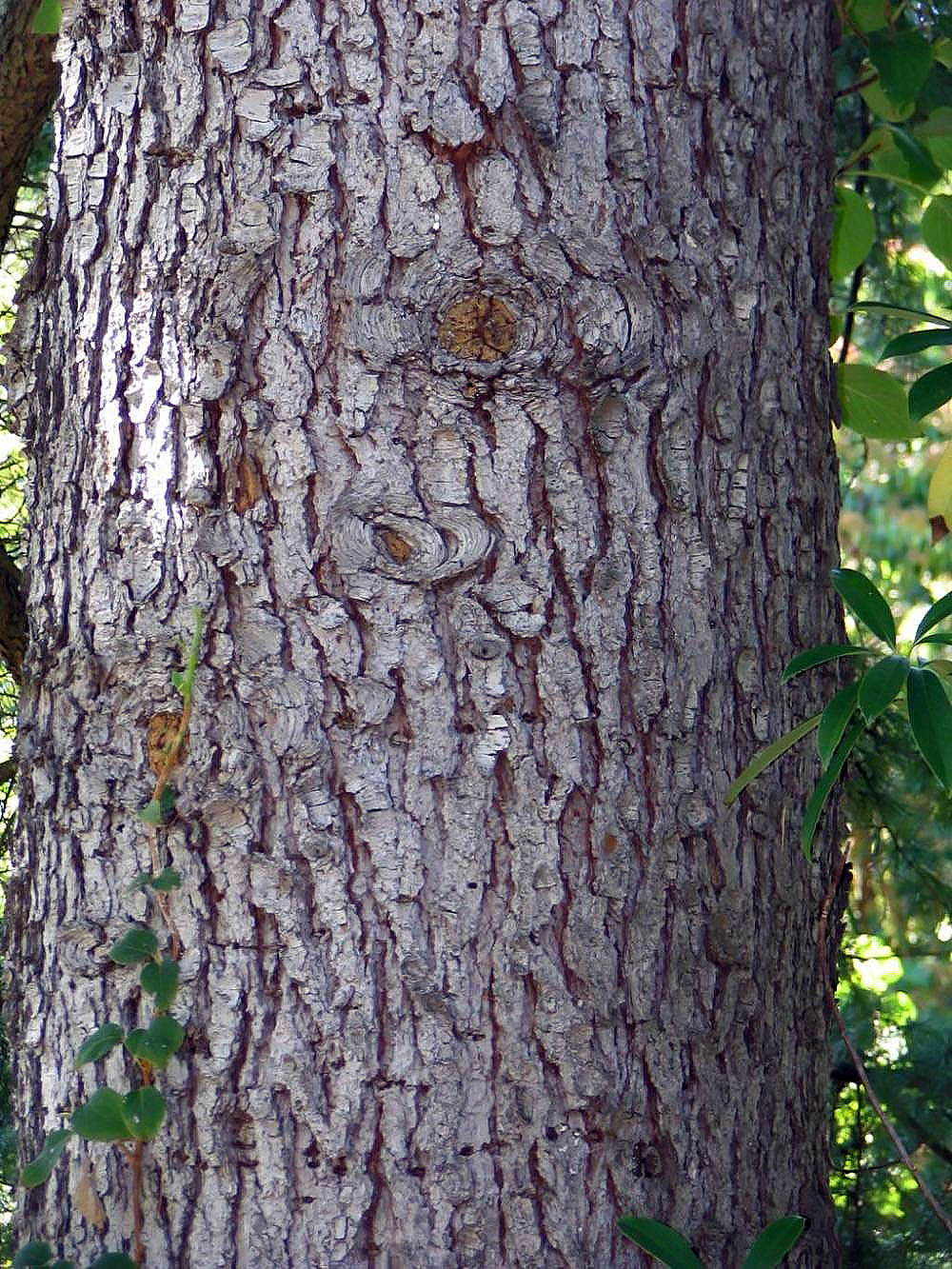
Trunk

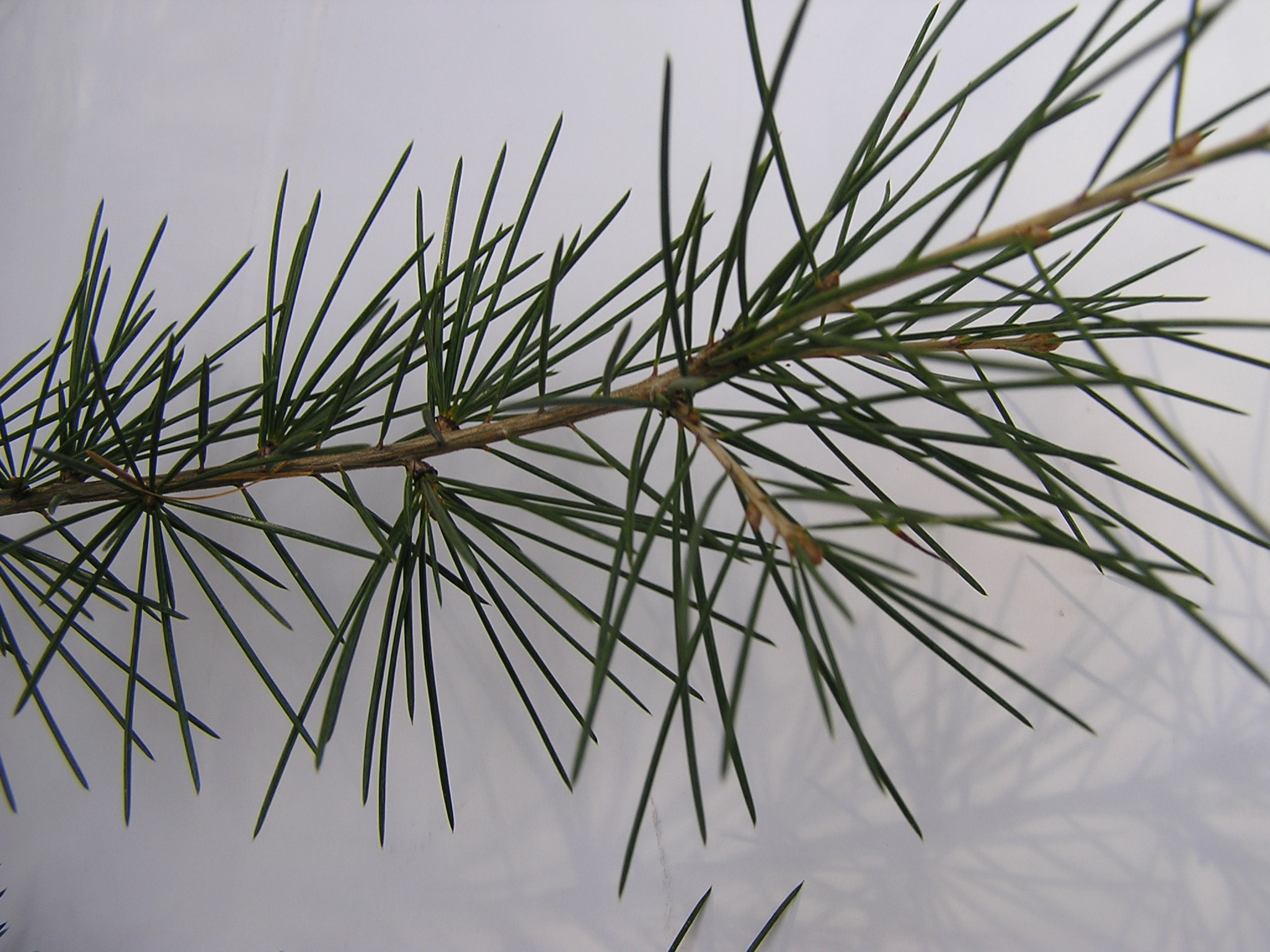
Close-up of leaves

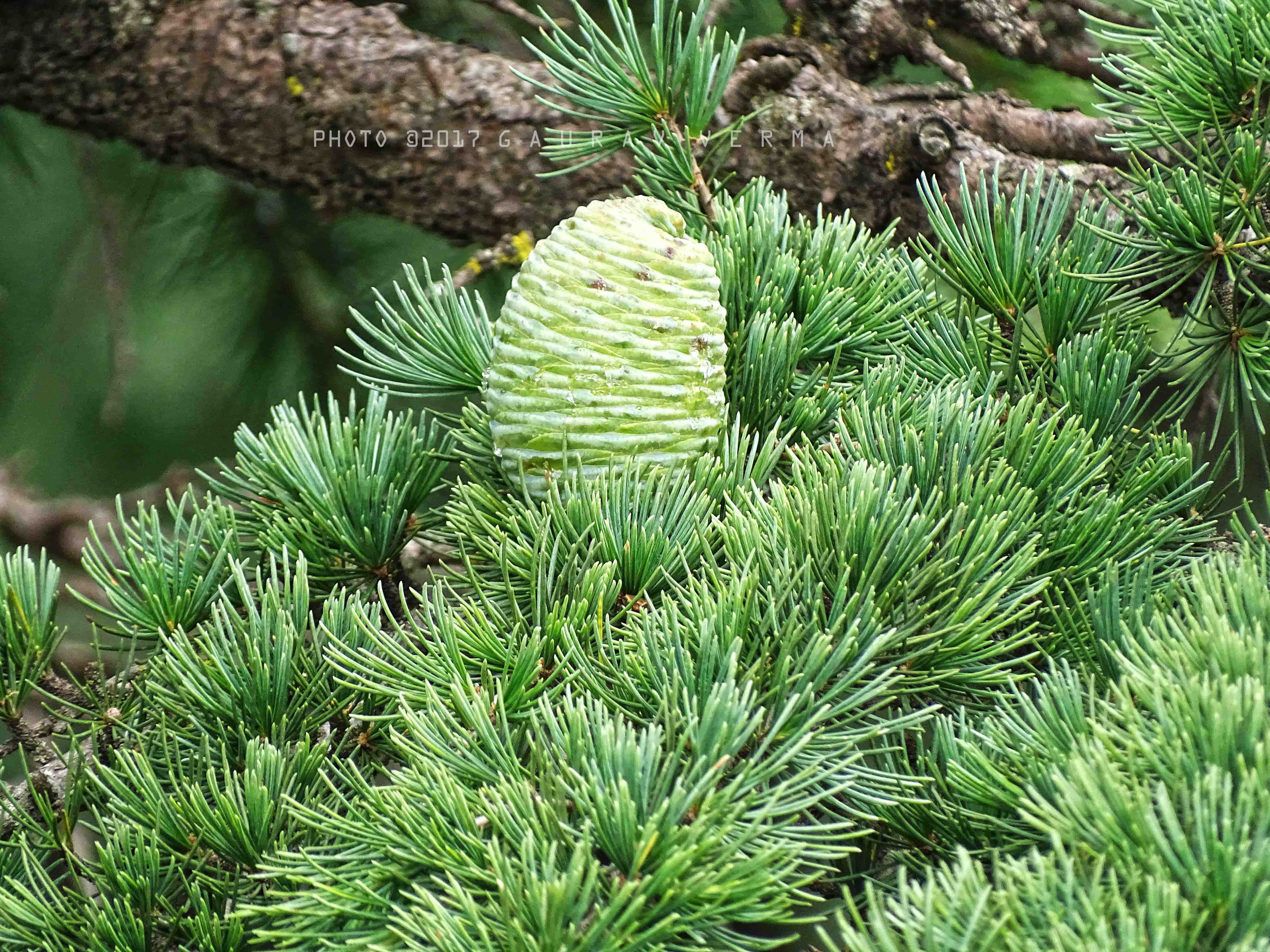
Leaves and female cone

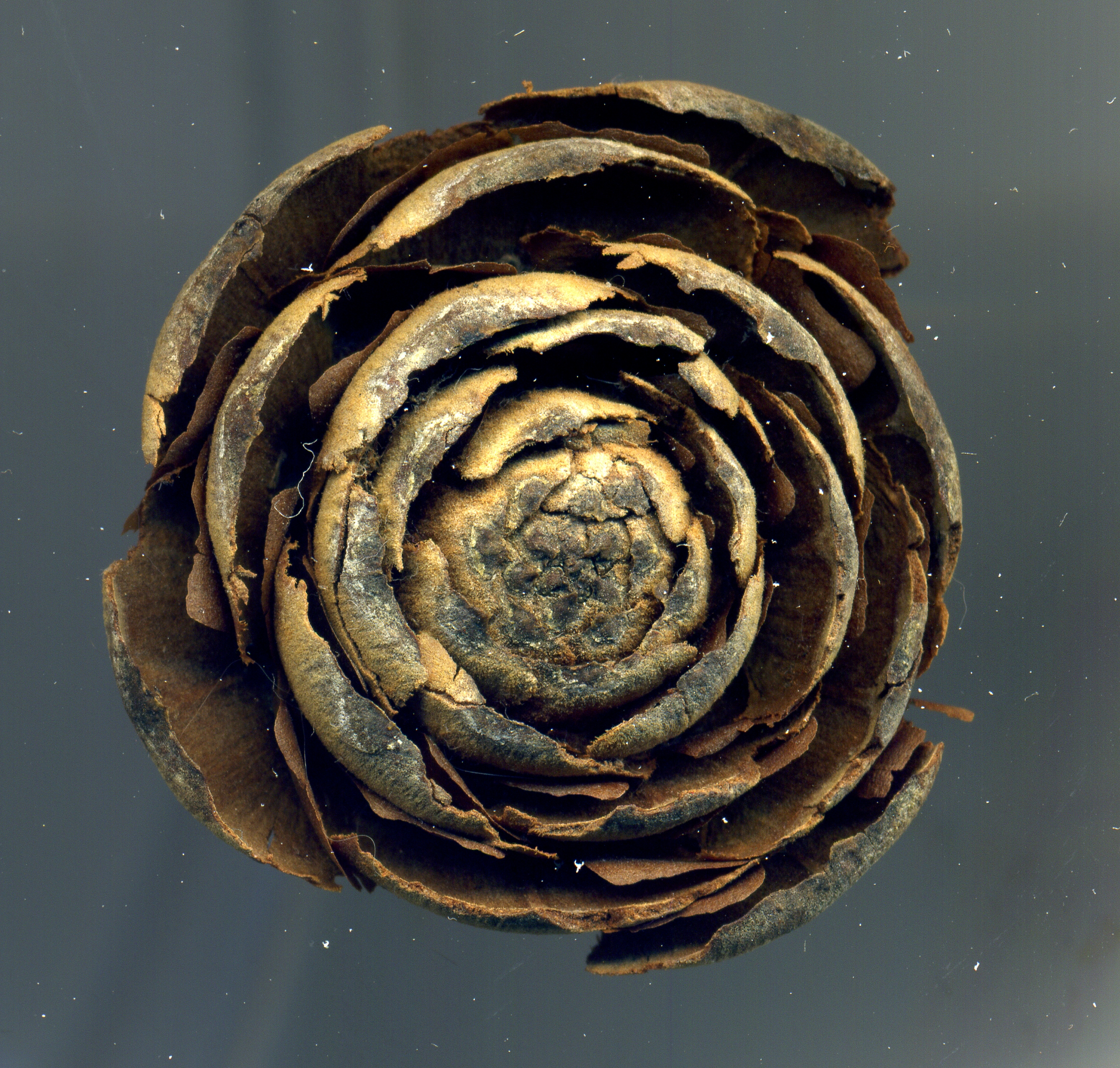
Top view of cone

=== Chemistry ===
The bark of Cedrus deodara contains large amounts of taxifolin. The wood contains cedeodarin, ampelopsin, cedrin, cedrinoside, and deodarin (3′,4′,5,6-tetrahydroxy-8-methyl dihydroflavonol). The main components of the needle essential oil include α-terpineol (30.2%), linalool (24.47%), limonene (17.01%), anethole (14.57%), caryophyllene (3.14%), and eugenol (2.14%). The deodar cedar also contains lignans and the phenolic sesquiterpene himasecolone, together with isopimaric acid. Other compounds have been identified, including (−)-matairesinol, (−)-nortrachelogenin, and a dibenzylbutyrolactollignan (4,4',9-trihydroxy-3,3'-dimethoxy-9,9'-epoxylignan).

== Etymology ==
The botanical name, which is also the English common name, is derived from the Sanskrit term devadāru, which means "wood of the gods", a compound of deva "god" and dāru "wood and tree".

== Distribution and habitat ==
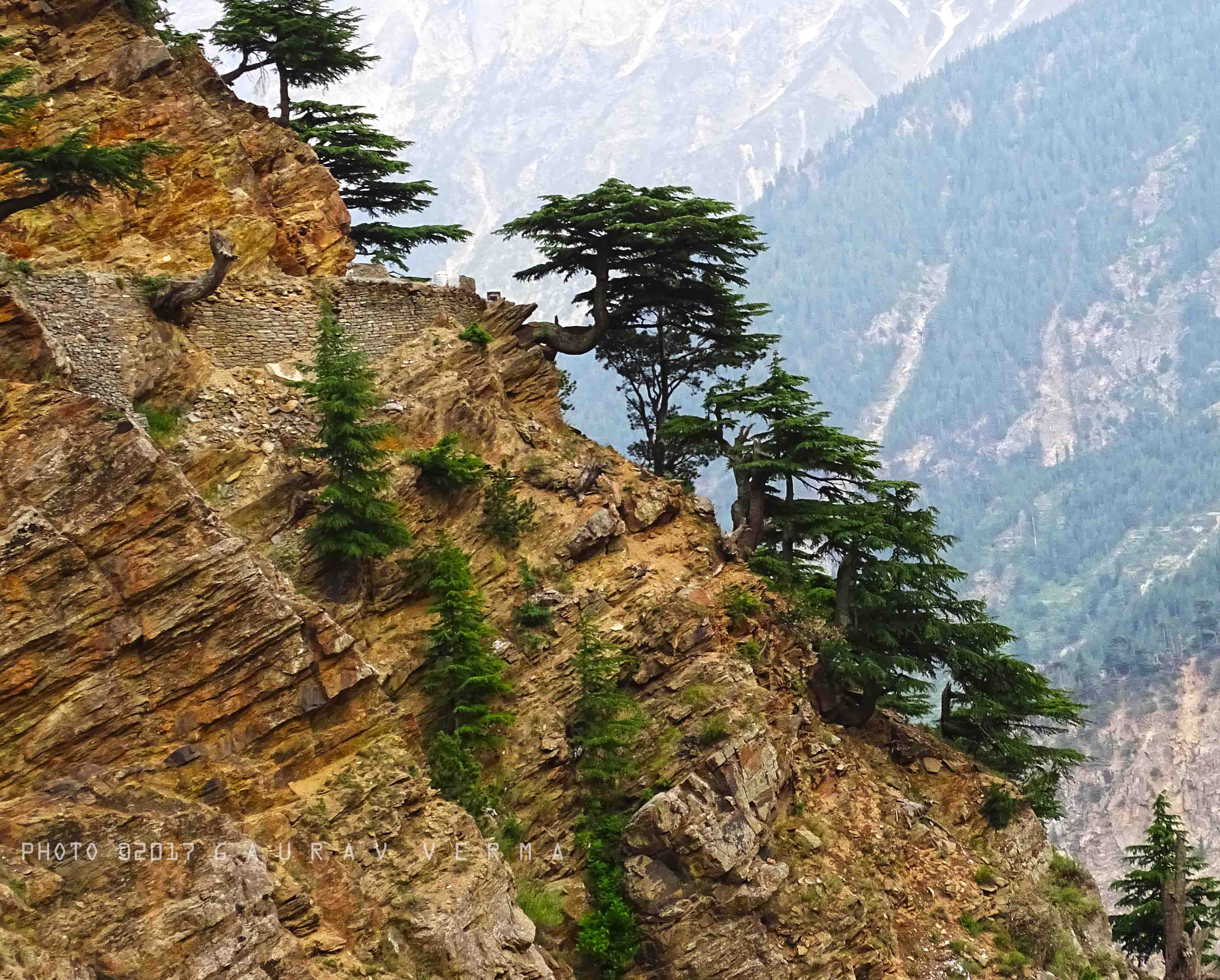
Trees growing in Kalpa, Himachal Pradesh, India

The species natively occurs in East-Afghanistan, South Western Tibet, Western Nepal, Northern Pakistan, and North-Central India.

It grows at elevations of 1,500–3,200 m (5,000–10,000 ft).

== Reproduction ==
"Deodar is a wind-pollinated monoecious species".

== Cultivation ==
It is widely grown as an ornamental tree, often planted in parks and large gardens for its drooping foliage. General cultivation is limited to areas with mild winters, with trees frequently killed by temperatures below about −25 °C (−13 °F), limiting it to USDA zone 7 and warmer for reliable growth. It can succeed in rather cool-summer climates, as in Ushuaia, Argentina.

The most cold-tolerant trees originate in the northwest of the species' range in Kashmir and Paktia Province, Afghanistan. Selected cultivars from this region are hardy to USDA zone 7 or even zone 6, tolerating temperatures down to about −30 °C (−22 °F). Named cultivars from this region include 'Eisregen', 'Eiswinter', 'Karl Fuchs', 'Kashmir', 'Polar Winter', and 'Shalimar'. Of these, 'Eisregen', 'Eiswinter', 'Karl Fuchs', and 'Polar Winter' were selected in Germany from seed collected in Paktia; 'Kashmir' was a selection of the nursery trade, whereas 'Shalimar' originated from seeds collected in 1964 from Shalimar Gardens, Kashmir and propagated at the Arnold Arboretum.

C. deodara and the three cultivars 'Feelin' Blue', 'Pendula' and 'Aurea' have gained the Royal Horticultural Society's Award of Garden Merit (confirmed 2021).

== Uses ==
=== Construction material ===
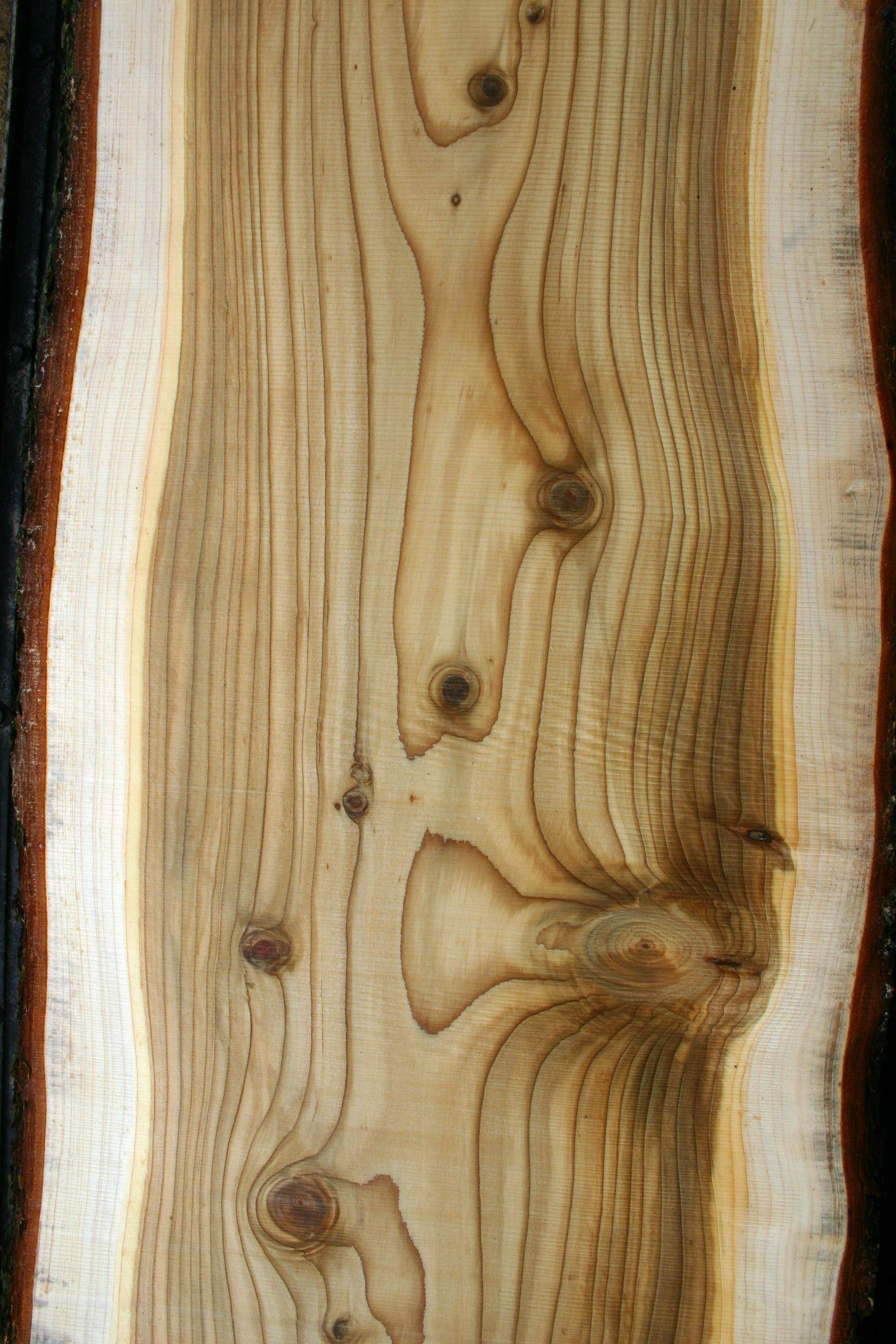
Wood

Deodar is in great demand as building material because of its durability, rot-resistant character and fine, close grain, which is capable of taking a high polish. Its historical use to construct religious temples and in landscaping around temples is well recorded. Its rot-resistant character also makes it an ideal wood for constructing the well-known houseboats of Srinagar, Kashmir. In Pakistan and India, during the British colonial period, deodar wood was used extensively for construction of barracks, public buildings, bridges, canals and railway cars. Despite its durability, it is not a strong timber, and its brittle nature makes it unsuitable for delicate work where strength is required, such as chair-making.

=== Herbal Ayurveda ===
C. deodara is used in Ayurvedic medicine.

The inner wood is aromatic and used to make incense. Inner wood is distilled into essential oil. As insects avoid this tree, the essential oil is used as insect repellent on the feet of horses, cattle and camels. It also has antifungal properties and has some potential for control of fungal deterioration of spices during storage. The outer bark and stem are astringent.

Because of its antifungal and insect repellent properties, rooms made of deodar cedar wood are used to store meat and food grains like oats and wheat in Shimla, Kullu, and Kinnaur district of Himachal Pradesh.

Cedar oil is often used for its aromatic properties, especially in aromatherapy. It has a characteristic woody odour which may change somewhat in the course of drying out. The crude oils are often yellowish or darker in colour. Its applications include soap perfumes, household sprays, floor polishes, and insecticides, and is also used in microscope work as a clearing oil.

=== Incense ===
The gum of the tree is used to make rope incense in Nepal and Tibet.

== Culture ==
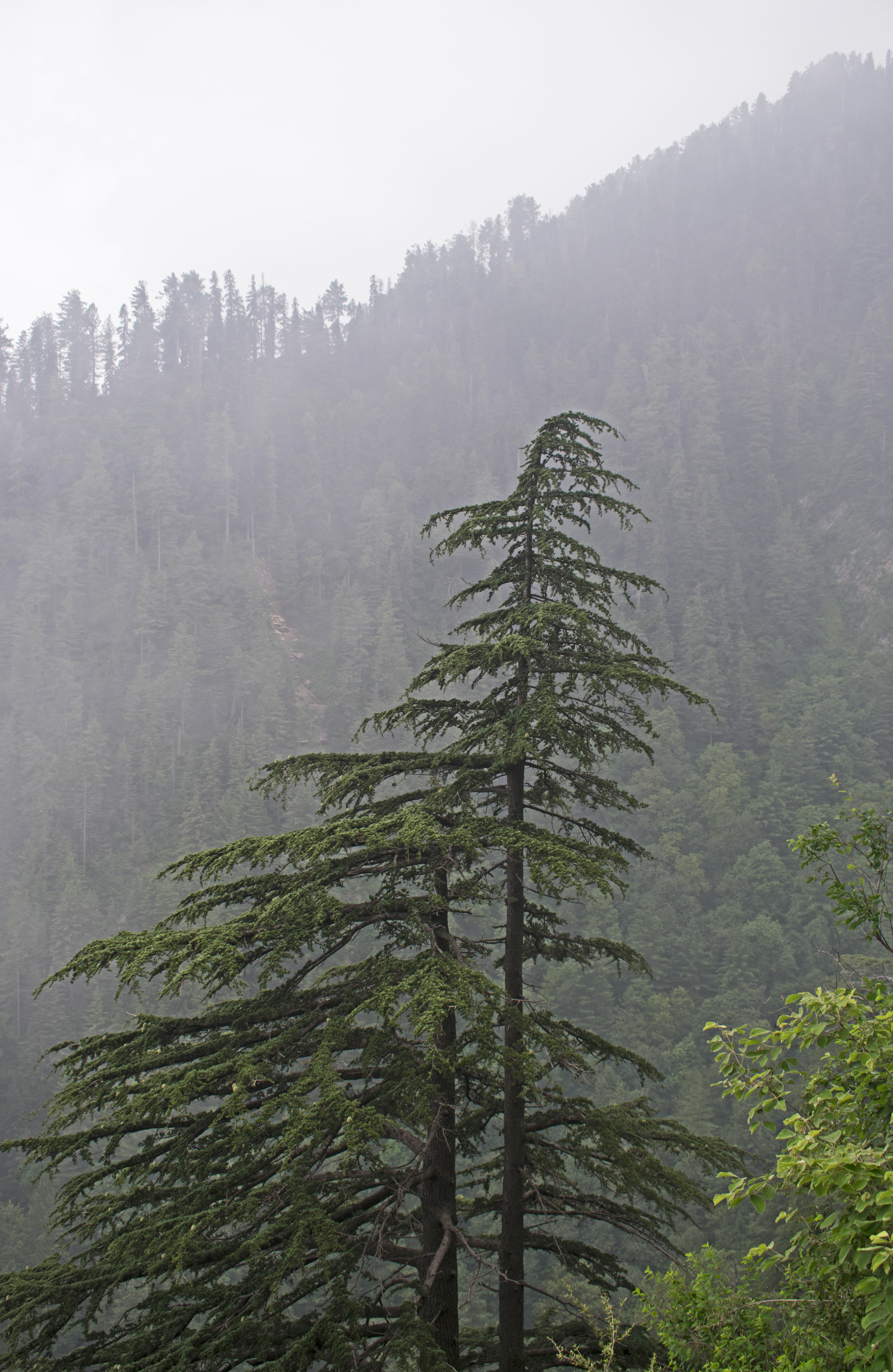
Cedrus deodara in Ayubia National Park, Khyber Pakhtunkhwa, Pakistan

Among Hindus, as the etymology of deodar suggests, it is worshiped as a divine tree. Deva, the first half of the Sanskrit term, means divine, deity, or deus. Dāru, the second part, is cognate with (related to) the words durum, druid, tree, and true. Several Hindu legends refer to this tree. For example, Valmiki Ramayan reads:

In the stands of Lodhra trees, Padmaka trees and in the woods of Devadaru, or Deodar trees, Ravana is to be searched there and there, together with Sita. [4-43-13]

The deodar is the national tree of Pakistan, and the state tree of Himachal Pradesh, India. In particular regions of Indian Central Himalayas such as the Jaunsar-Bawar region of Dehradun, Uttarakhand control over deodar trees is also caste-mediated. Upper-caste groups control and extract these trees for smuggling and developing personal wealth and profit. Deodar trees are huge sources of both economic and social capital. As a result, massive deodar extraction takes place, which makes ecologically sensitive regions extremely vulnerable. Thus, deodar is not simply a natural resource, rather hold deeply embedded social, political and economic value in many societies.

Under the Deodars was an 1889 short story collection by Rudyard Kipling.

The 1902 musical A Country Girl featured a song called "Under the Deodar."

== See also ==
- List of Indian timber trees
