= Jorkanden =

Himalayan peak

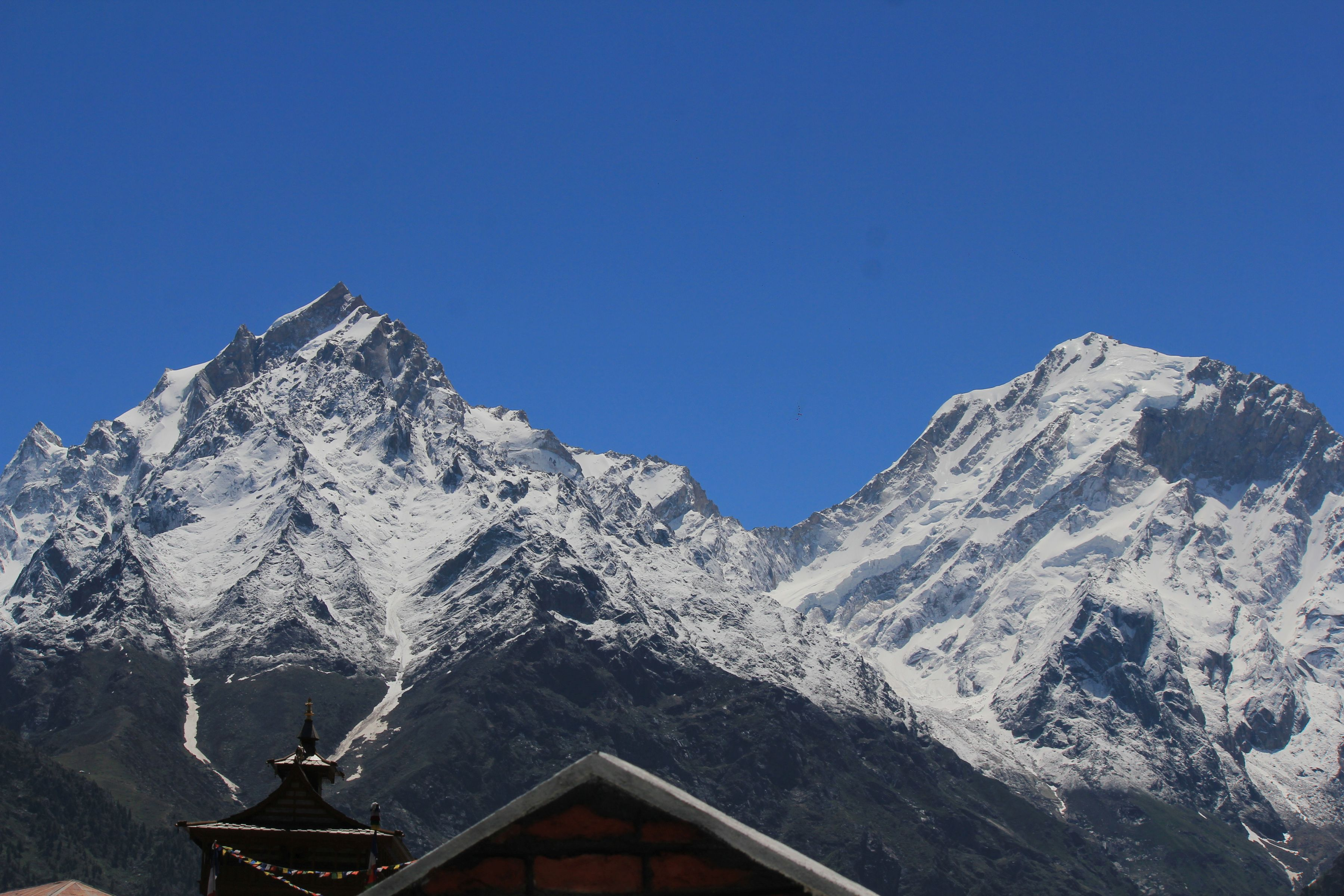
- Jorkanden is the peak on the right (as visible from Kalpa, Himachal Pradesh); on the left is Kinnaur Kailash, which is often misidentified as Jorkanden

Highest point
- Elevation: 6,473 m (21,237 ft)
- Listing: Mountains of Himachal Pradesh
- Coordinates: 31°29′51″N 78°22′29″E

Geography
- Location within Himachal Pradesh Location within India
- Parent range: Kinner Kailash range, Himalayas

Climbing
- First ascent: 26 May 1974; An expedition by the Indo-Tibetan Border Police

Jorkanden is a 6,473-metre (21,237 ft) high Himalayan peak in the Indian state of Himachal Pradesh. It is the highest peak in the Kinner Kailash range of the Greater Himalayas. An expedition team of the Indo-Tibetan Border Police first climbed the peak on 26 May 1974. The peak is often confused with the Kinnaur Kailash peak 6,050 metres (19,850 ft), which can be distinguished through its distinctly pointed 'pillar' on top, which is worshipped as a shivling, abode of the Indian god Shiva.

== Bibliography ==
- Kapadia, Harish (2002). High Himalaya Unknown Valleys. Indus Publishing. ISBN 9788173871177.
- Sanan, Deepak; Dhanu, Swadi (2002). Exploring Kinnaur in the Trans-Himalaya. Indus Publishing. ISBN 9788173871313.
