= Industry in Himachal Pradesh =

Ecology has been given importance in the state during the last few years. Industries becoming the cause of water or air pollution are not encouraged. Every industrial project has to be passed by the clearance of the Environment Protection Organization before its establishment.

Himachal Pradesh is renowned as Asia's pharmaceutical hub, housing a total of 652 pharmaceutical units. The state hosts a thriving ₹40,000 crore drug manufacturing industry.

The state is facing a number of difficulties in the advancement of industries. Lack of means of dependable transport and poor accessibility was one of the major drawbacks. Other problems faced by the state were the poor mineral resources, non-availability of infrastructure and communication facilities, shortage of capital and lack of modern skills. The only plus point of the state was the ample availability of electricity.

In order to develop industrialization, a number of new policies were adopted by the state government like providing various incentives such as cheaper power, twenty five percent subsidy besides easier credit facilities through the State Finance Corporation and the nationalised banks for establishing new industries. Also, land was made available on 99 years low rate lease basis and new industries were exempted from sales or purchase tax. Concessions were also given on charges for transportation of raw materials from the nearest railhead outside the state beside provision of other marginal benefits. These concessions helped the state in establishing industrial houses.

Gagret, Parwano, Barotiwala, Baddi, Paonta Sahib, Mehatpur, Shamshi, Nagrotu Bagwan, Bilaspur, Reckong Peo and Sansar Pur Tera are some of the industrial areas of the state at present. As the dust free climate of Himachal is extremely suitable for the setting up of electronic industries, many electronic complexes have been established at Solan, Mandi, Hamirpur, Shogi, Raga-Ka-Bagh, Chamba, Ambi, Taliwala and Keylong.
