= Kalpa, Himachal Pradesh =

Kalpa
- Village
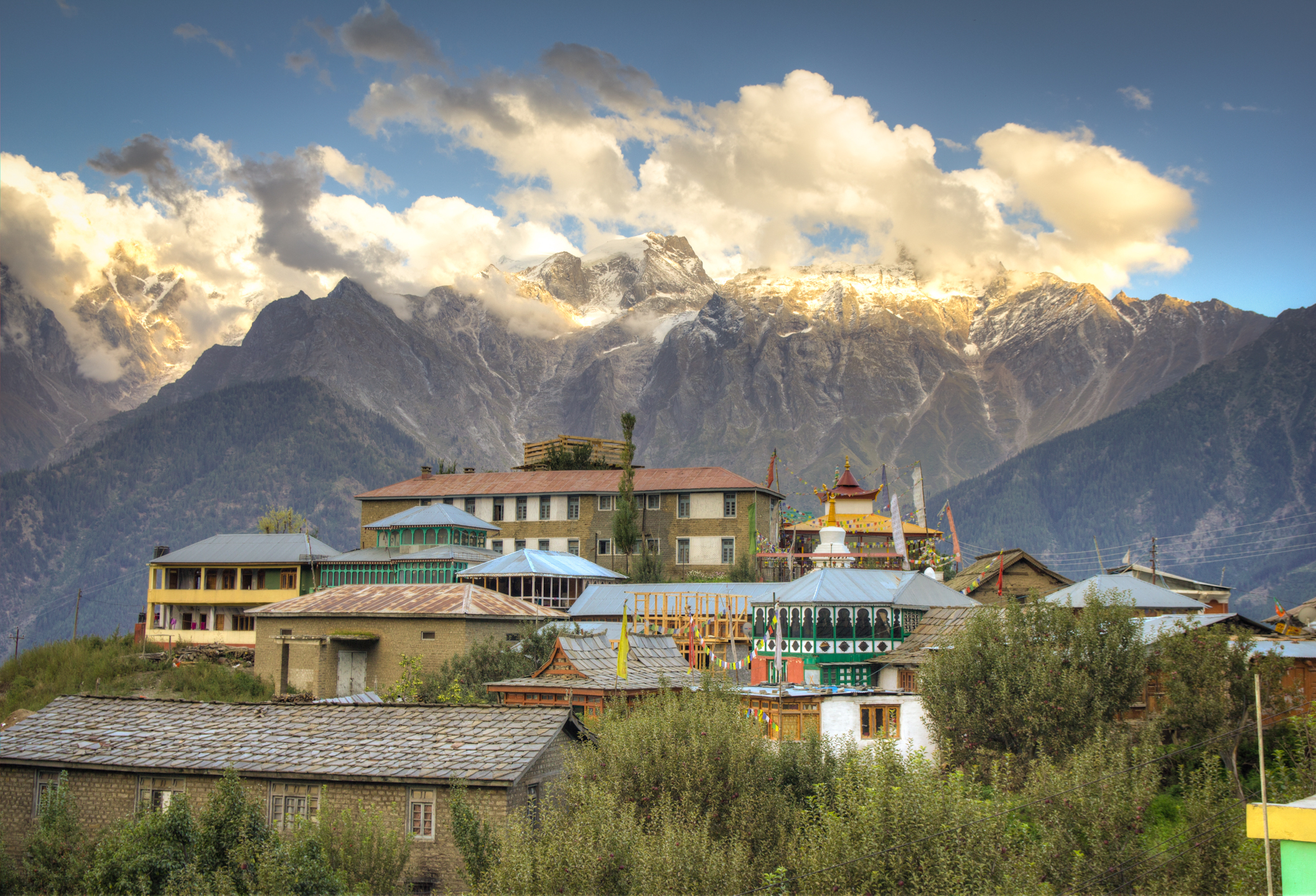

- Location in Himachal Pradesh, India Kalpa (India)
- Coordinates: 31.53°N 78.25°E
- Country: India
- State: Himachal Pradesh
- District: Kinnaur

Government
  - Type: Democracy
- Elevation: 2,960 m (9,710 ft)

Languages
  - Official: Hindi
  - Native: Kinnauri
- Time zone: UTC+5:30 (IST)
- PIN: 172108
- Vehicle registration: HP-25

Kalpa Village Lane

Kalpa is a small village lying above Reckong Peo, the district headquarters of the Kinnaur district, Himachal Pradesh state, north India. Geographically, Kalpa lies in the Sutlej river valley of the Indian Himalaya. The region is inhabited by the Kinnauri people and is known for its apple orchards, as apples are a major cash-crop for the region. The local Kinnauri follow a syncretism of Hinduism and Buddhism, and many temples in Kalpa are dedicated to both Hindu and Buddhist gods and goddesses. The average literacy rate of Kalpa is around 83.75%. India's first ever voter, Shyam Saran Negi, also belongs to Kalpa.

== Geography ==
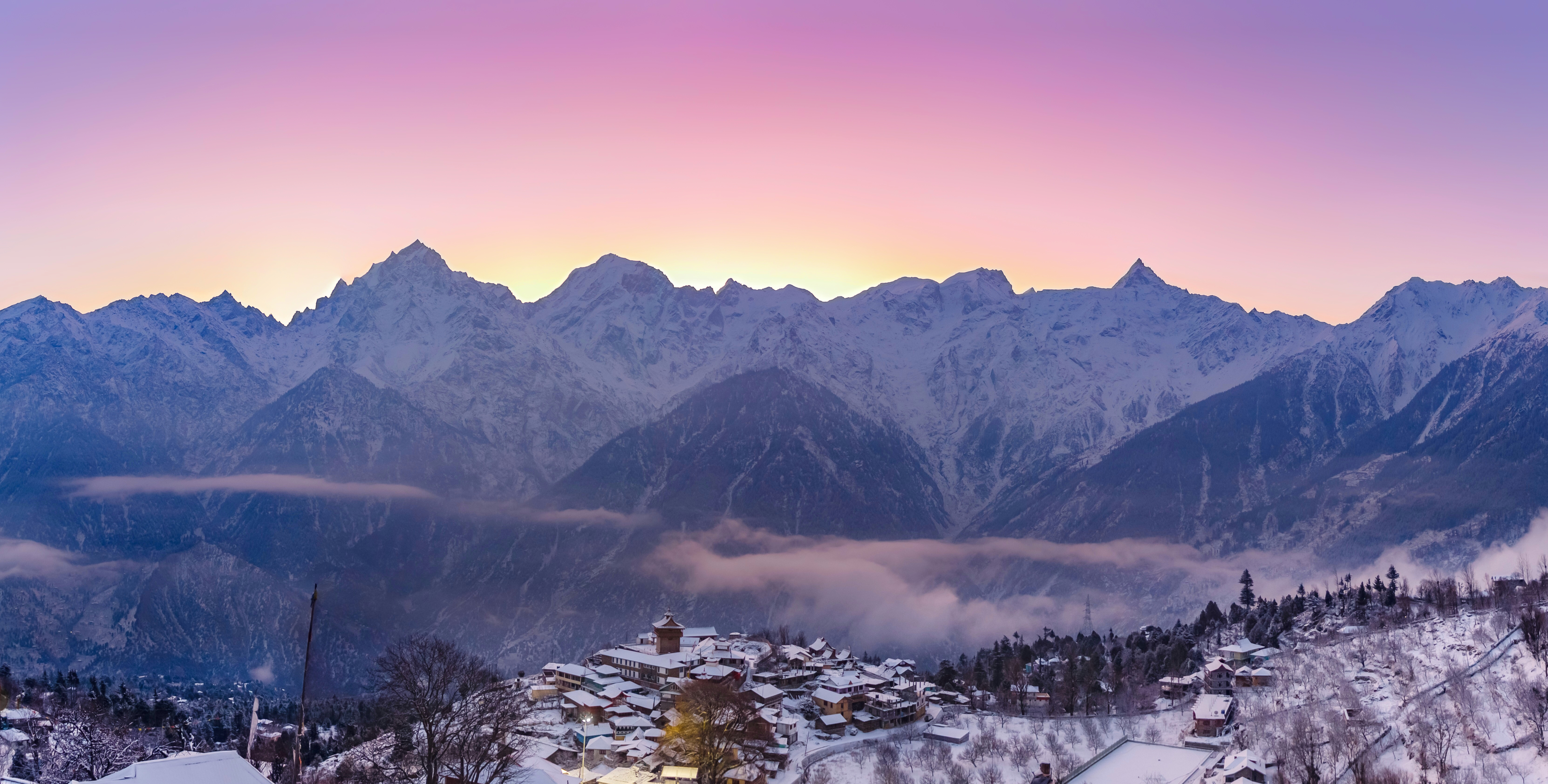
The Kinnaur Kailash massif towers over the town of Kalpa

Kalpa is at 31.53°N 78.25°E. It has an average elevation of 2,960 metres (9,711 feet) and is located 265 kilometres (165 mi) beyond Shimla on the NH-5 in Kinnaur district. It sits at the base of the snow-capped Kinnaur Kailash ranges. The Shivling peaks rise up to 6,000 m (20,000 feet). Kalpa is nestled among apple orchards, pine-nut forests, and the stately deodhars.

== Overview ==
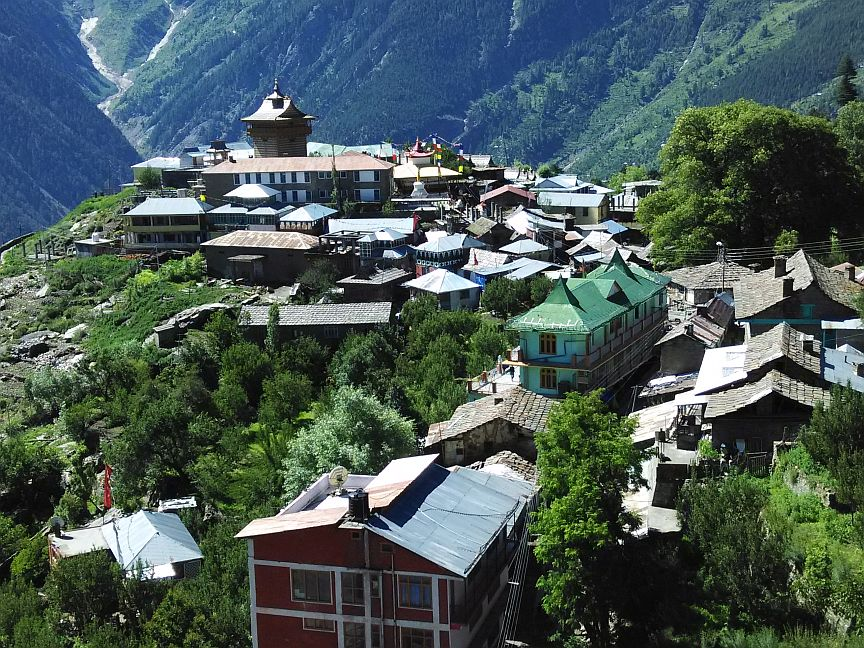
Kalpa as of June 2015

Kalpa was known as "Chini" during the colonial and pre colonial period. It was tehsil headquarter during colonial times and later became district headquarter of Kinnaur before it was shifted to Reckong Peo.

The Sutlej River below runs through deep gorges, and the winding mountain road is bordered by chilgoza forests. The serenity of this sleepy hamlet was not often visited by foreigners until recently, but there are still relatively few visitors. There are now more than five places to stay in Kalpa and more below in Reckong Peo where travelers must stop to get their inner line permits to continue upwards to the Spiti Valley, which is a small ancient part of what used to be Tibet. Also visible from here is the sacred Shivling rock on the Kailash mountain that changes its color at different points in the day.

In Episode 5 of Ice Road Truckers#IRT: Deadliest Roads - Season 1: Himalayas Lisa Kelly and Rick Yemm delivered two images (one each) (well packed with sandbags and sand and straw) of the goddess Kali (shown as treading on her husband Shiva) along a frightful mountain road hacked out of cliffsides to a temple at Kalpa.

== Demography ==
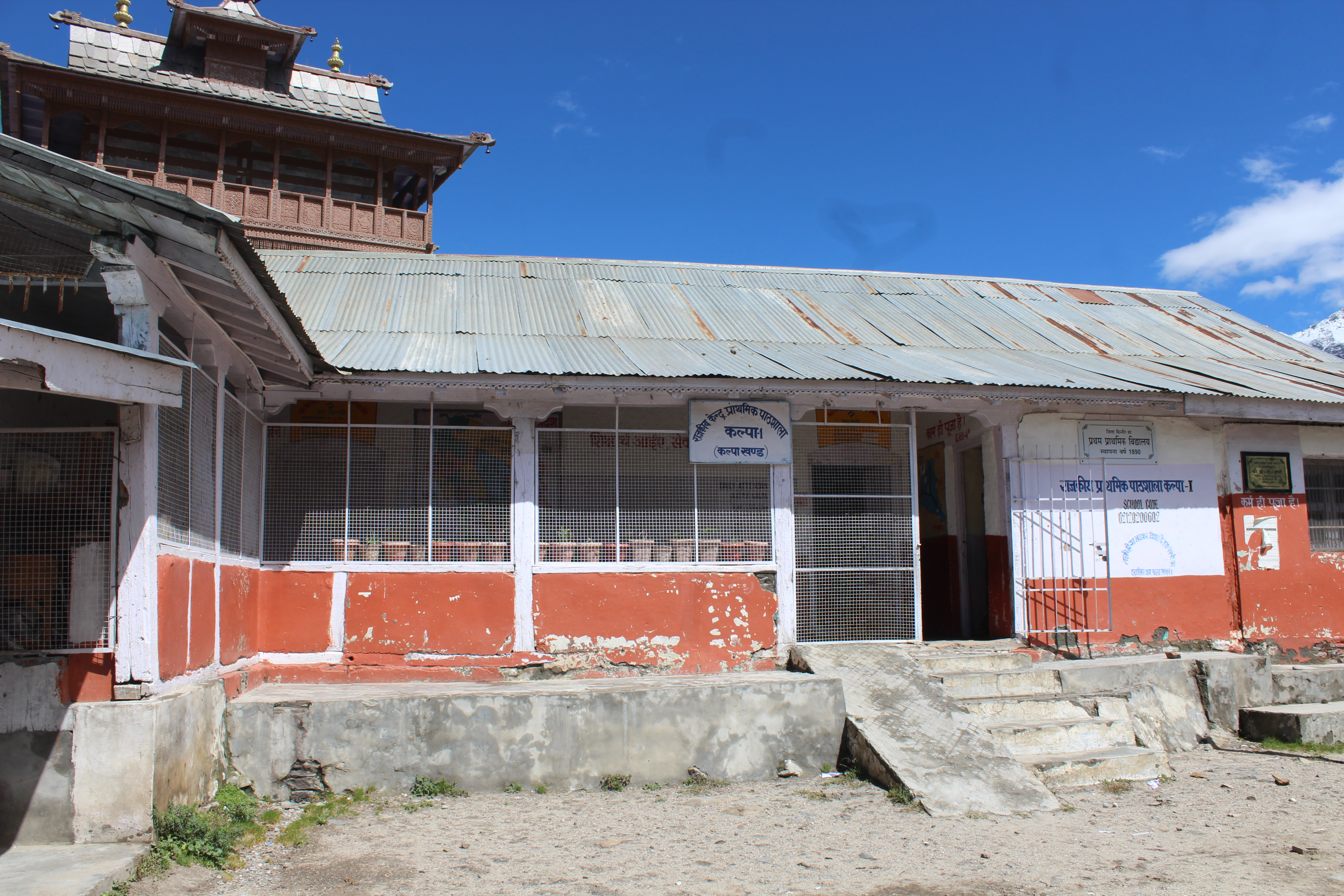
Government Primary School, Kalpa

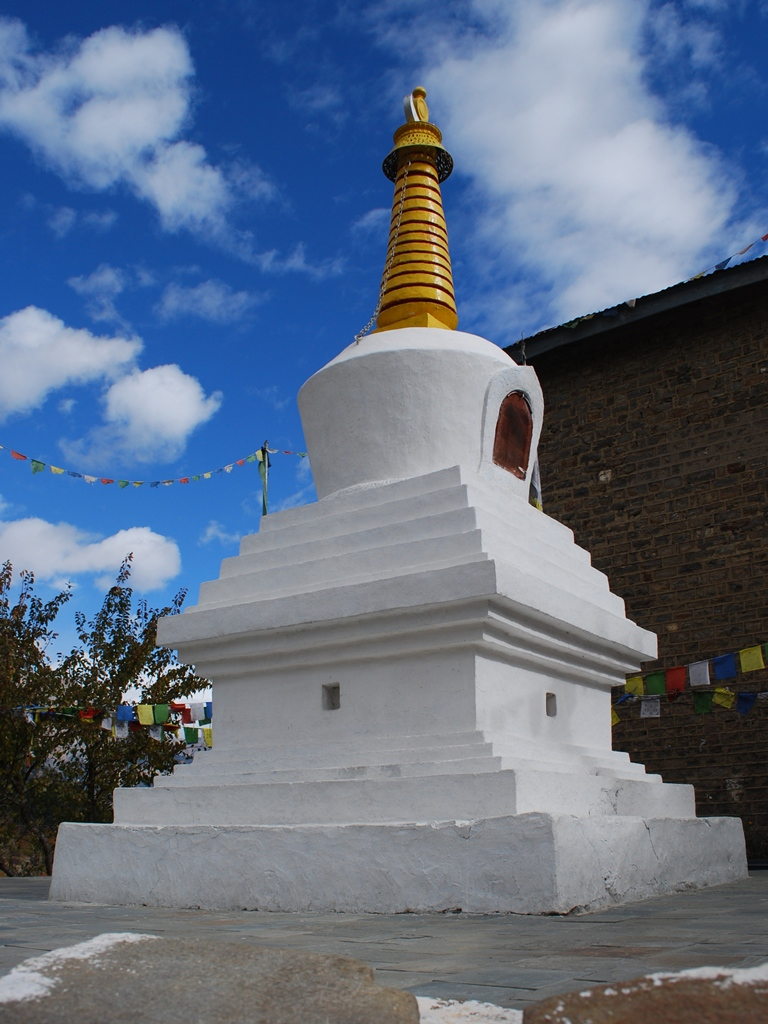
Buddhist stupa at Kalpa

Kalpa has an average literacy rate of 83.75%.

=== Religion ===
Hinduism is the main religion in the district followed by Tibetan Buddhism. These two religions have undergone religious mixing, along with some indigenous shamanistic practices.

== Places of interest ==
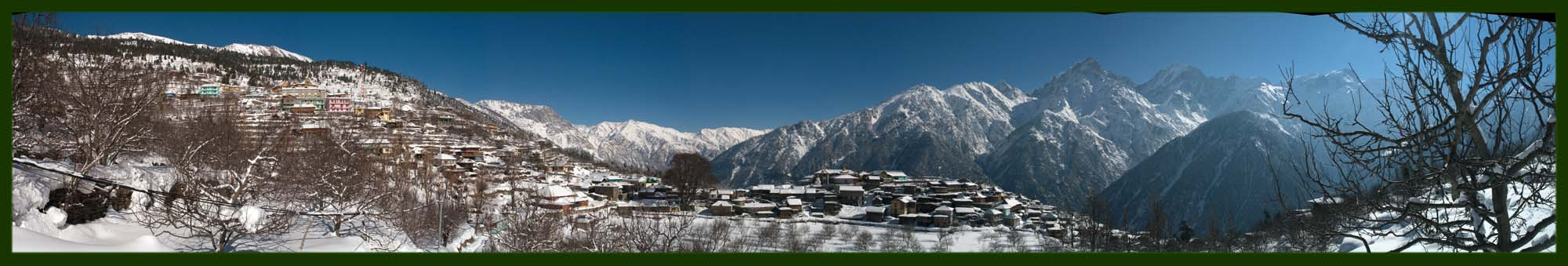
Kapla panoramic view

Reckong Peo: Located 260 kilometres (160 mi) from Shimla, 7 kilometres or 4.3 miles from Powari and 8 kilometres or 5.0 miles from Kalpa. Reckong Peo is the headquarters of district Kinnaur.

Kothi Temple: 3 kilometres or 1.9 miles from Reckong Peo. Kothi has a temple dedicated to the goddess Chandika Devi. The temple has an unusual architectural style and fine sculpture. A gold image of the goddess is enshrined in the sanctum.

== Education ==
The first primary school in Kinnaur (also known as Chini tehsil in British colonial times) opened at kalpa in late 19th century.

== Agriculture ==
The region is very famous for its production of high-quality apples and pinus gerardiana, also known as chilghoza. All of tehsil Kalpa is apple growing area, the primary crop for residents of the area. Kalpa is surrounded by Deodar, apple, and pinus gerardiana chilghoza trees.

== Climate ==
Kalpa enjoys a temperate climate (Köppen Cfb) due to its high elevation, with long winters from October to May, and short summers from June to September. In winter, all the villages are covered by about 5 to 7 feet (1.5 to 2.1 m) of snow, and the temperature can drop to as low as −20 °C or −4 °F. Warm clothing may be necessary even in the summer.

Climate data for Kalpa (1991–2020, extremes 1984–2020)
Month	Jan	Feb	Mar	Apr	May	Jun	Jul	Aug	Sep	Oct	Nov	Dec	Year
Record high °C (°F)	16.1 (61.0)	18.1 (64.6)	24.4 (75.9)	25.2 (77.4)	29.4 (84.9)	30.7 (87.3)	28.4 (83.1)	28.3 (82.9)	28.3 (82.9)	24.6 (76.3)	24.5 (76.1)	19.0 (66.2)	30.7 (87.3)
Mean daily maximum °C (°F)	5.2 (41.4)	6.7 (44.1)	11.5 (52.7)	17.0 (62.6)	20.7 (69.3)	22.8 (73.0)	22.8 (73.0)	22.3 (72.1)	21.0 (69.8)	18.5 (65.3)	14.4 (57.9)	9.3 (48.7)	15.9 (60.6)
Mean daily minimum °C (°F)	−3.8 (25.2)	−2.9 (26.8)	0.4 (32.7)	4.0 (39.2)	6.8 (44.2)	10.1 (50.2)	12.9 (55.2)	12.6 (54.7)	9.2 (48.6)	4.1 (39.4)	1.2 (34.2)	−1.6 (29.1)	4.3 (39.7)
Record low °C (°F)	−15.4 (4.3)	−11.0 (12.2)	−10.8 (12.6)	−3.5 (25.7)	−0.5 (31.1)	2.0 (35.6)	6.0 (42.8)	5.8 (42.4)	1.0 (33.8)	−3.6 (25.5)	−5.5 (22.1)	−8.6 (16.5)	−15.4 (4.3)
Average precipitation mm (inches)	94.7 (3.73)	103.7 (4.08)	147.3 (5.80)	65.2 (2.57)	57.3 (2.26)	35.7 (1.41)	52.4 (2.06)	51.4 (2.02)	66.5 (2.62)	24.3 (0.96)	27.9 (1.10)	35.1 (1.38)	761.1 (29.96)
Average precipitation days	6.3	7.1	7.7	5.7	5.5	3.0	5.1	5.9	4.8	1.3	1.8	2.8	56.9
Average relative humidity (%) (at 17:30 IST)	43	48	41	40	44	51	65	70	63	44	36	34	48
Source: India Meteorological Department

== Gallery ==
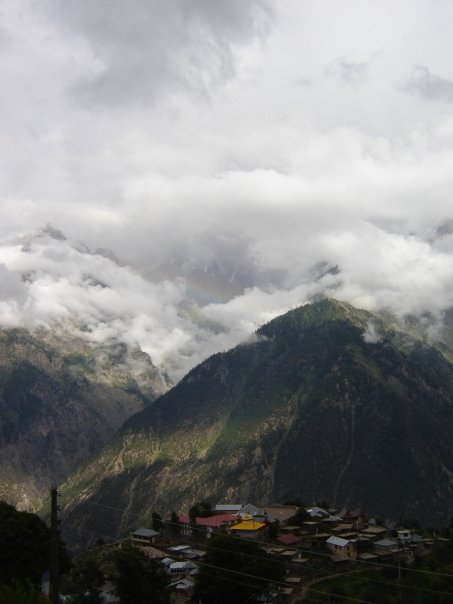
Kalpa and Kinnaur Kailash during monsoon weather

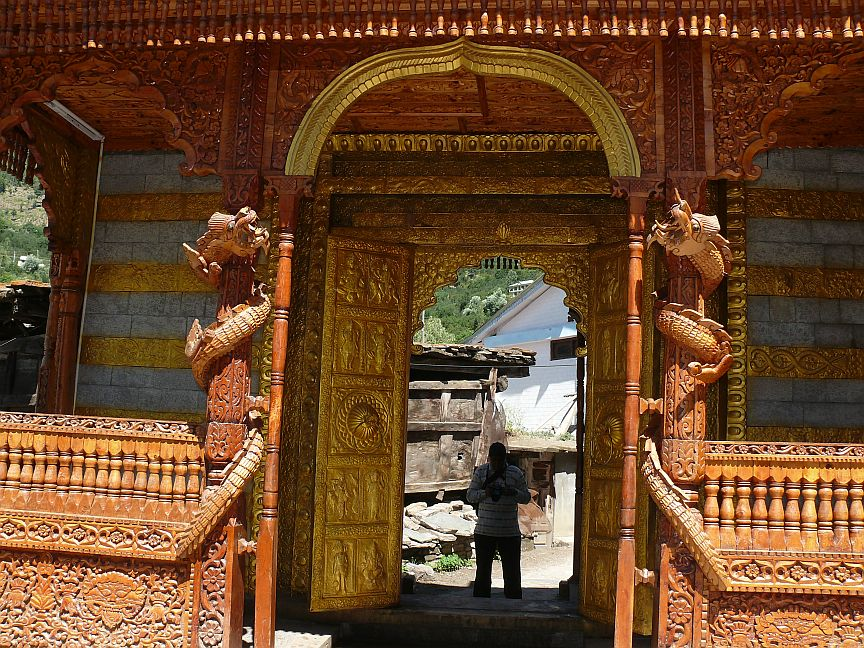
Wood work at main Entrance of Hindu Temple at Kalpa

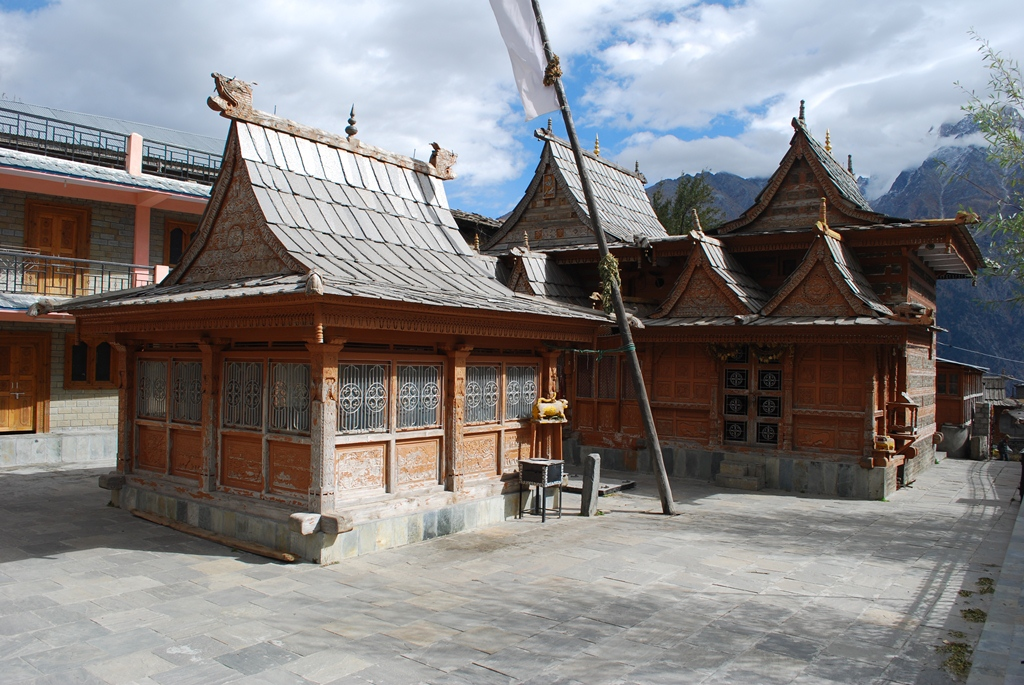
Hindu Temple at Kalpa

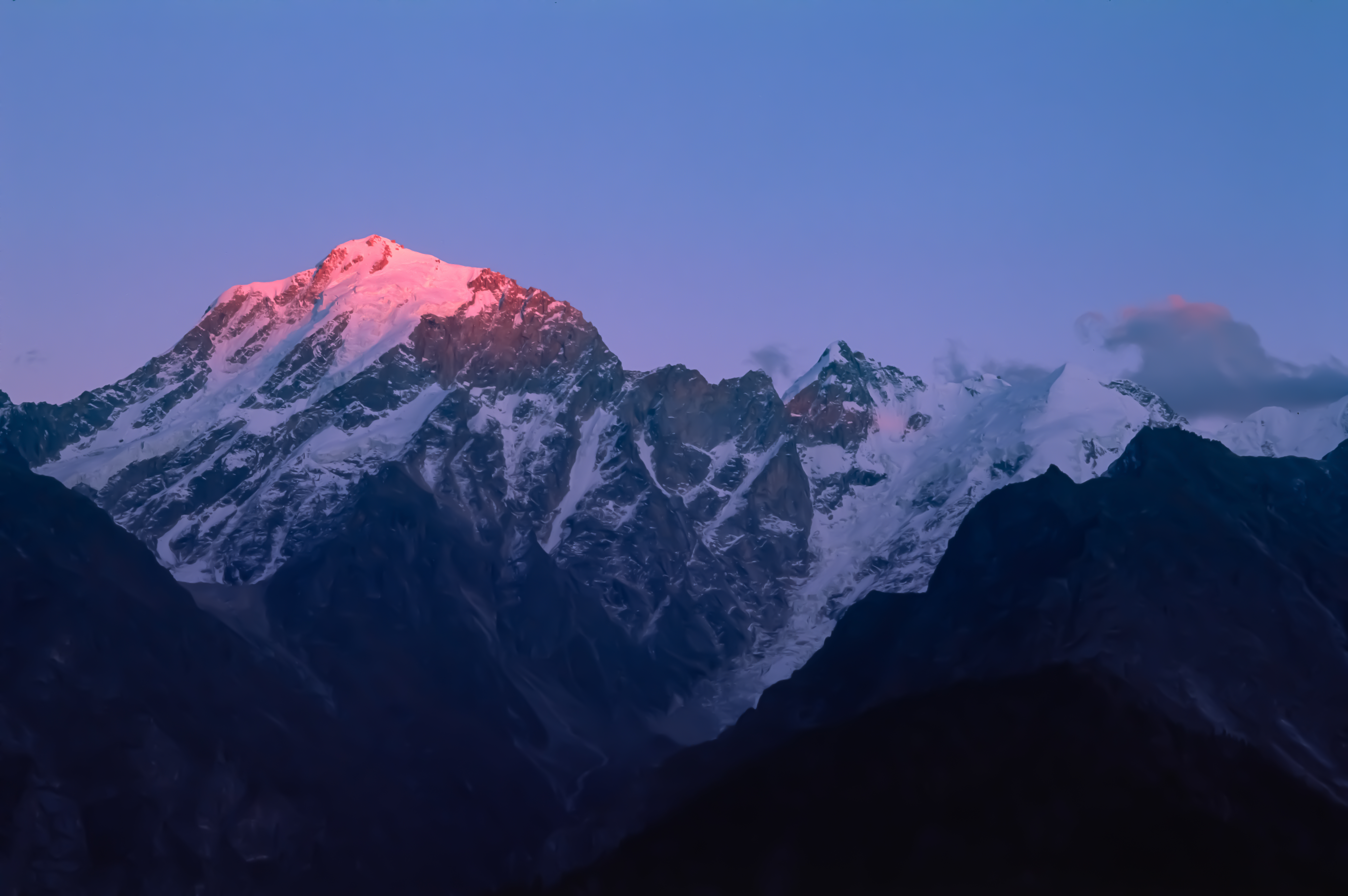
Kinnaur Kailash from Kalpa

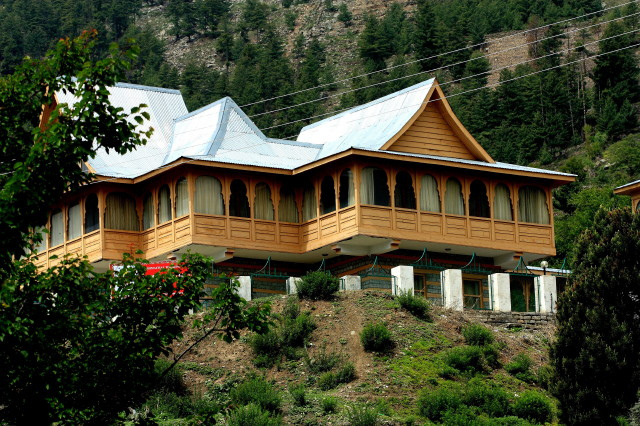
Kinnaur Kailash Resort Kalpa

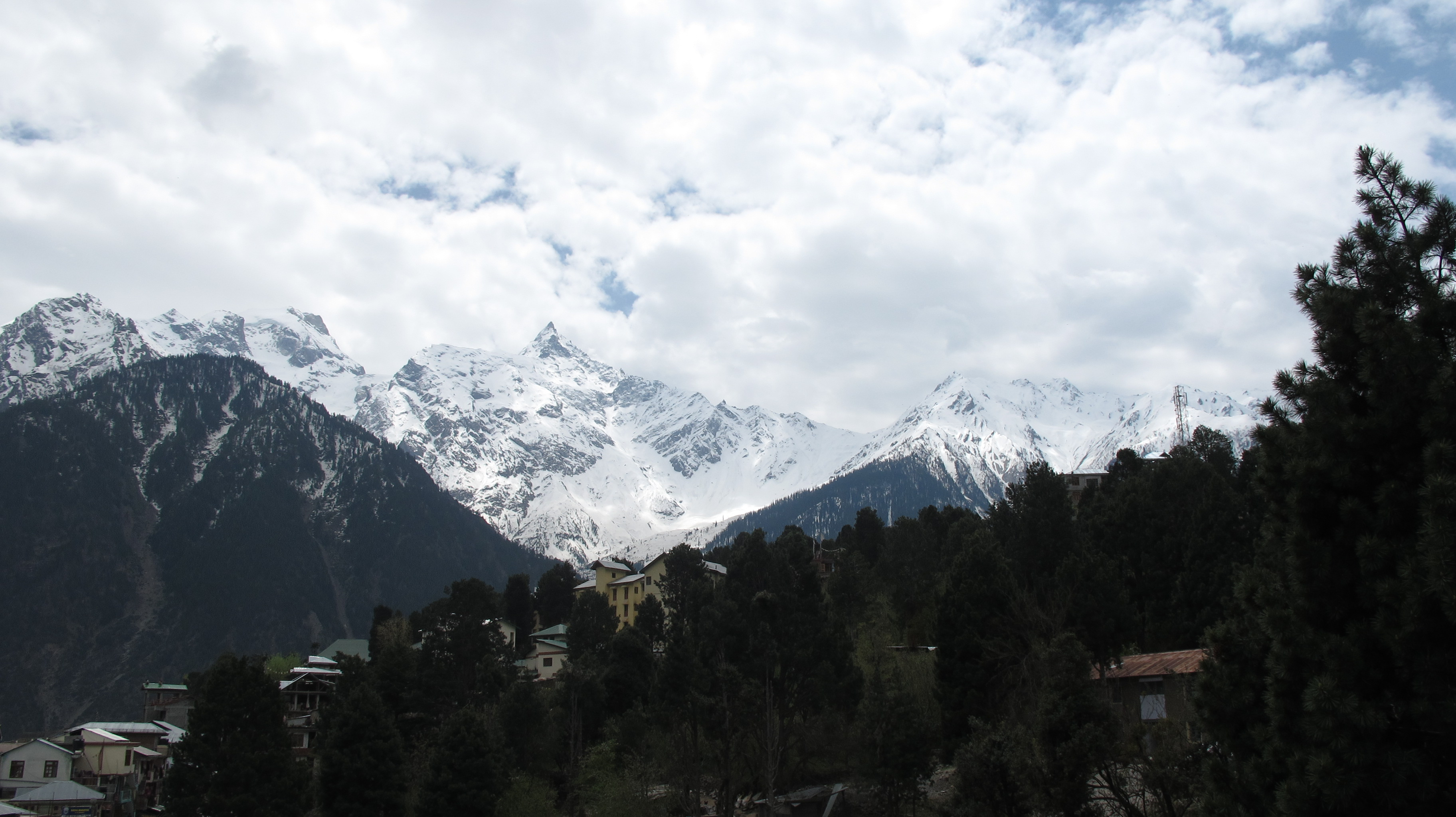
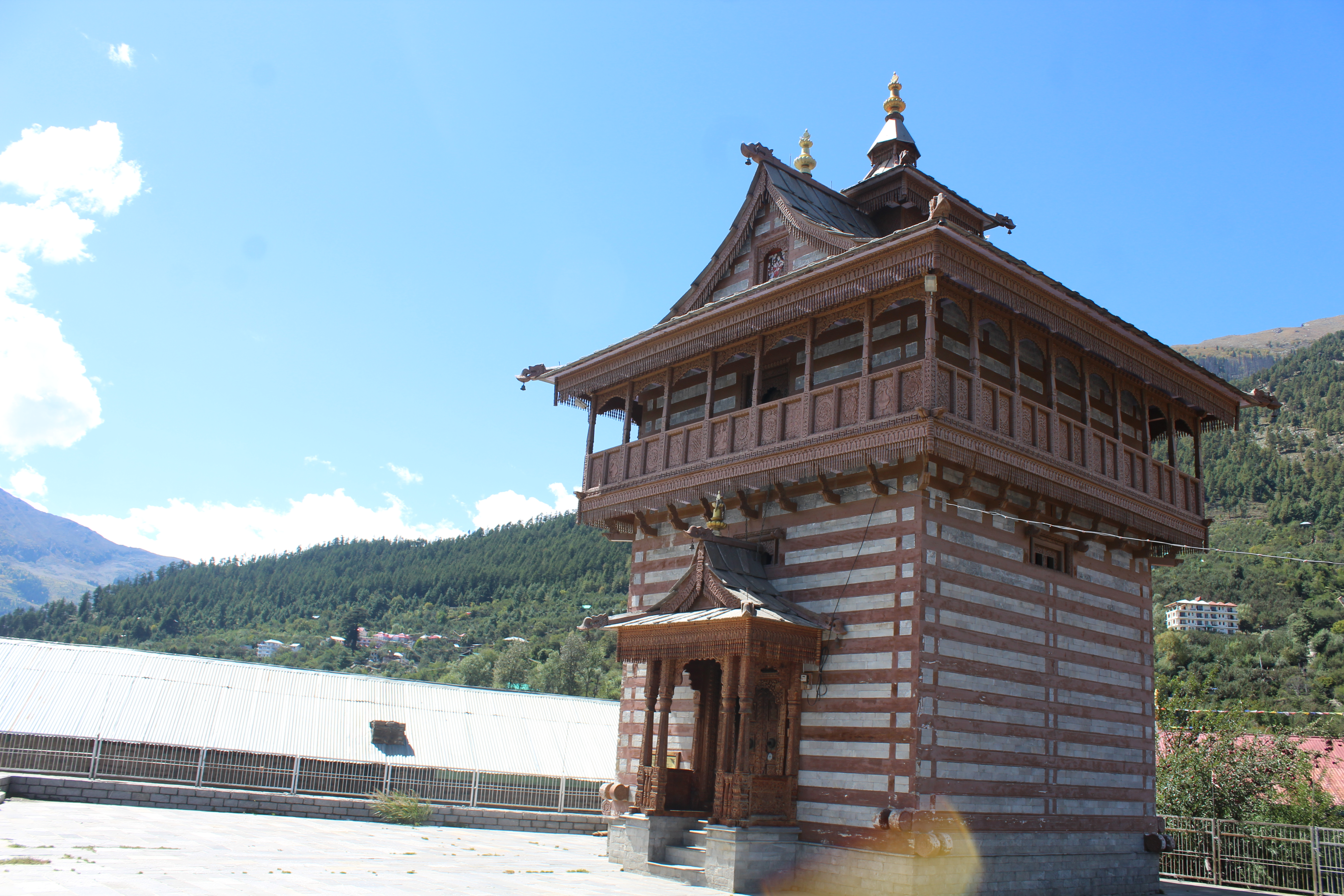
Kila chini (kalpa)
Kinnaur Kailash range form Kalpa
