= Reckong Peo =

Reckong Peo Peo
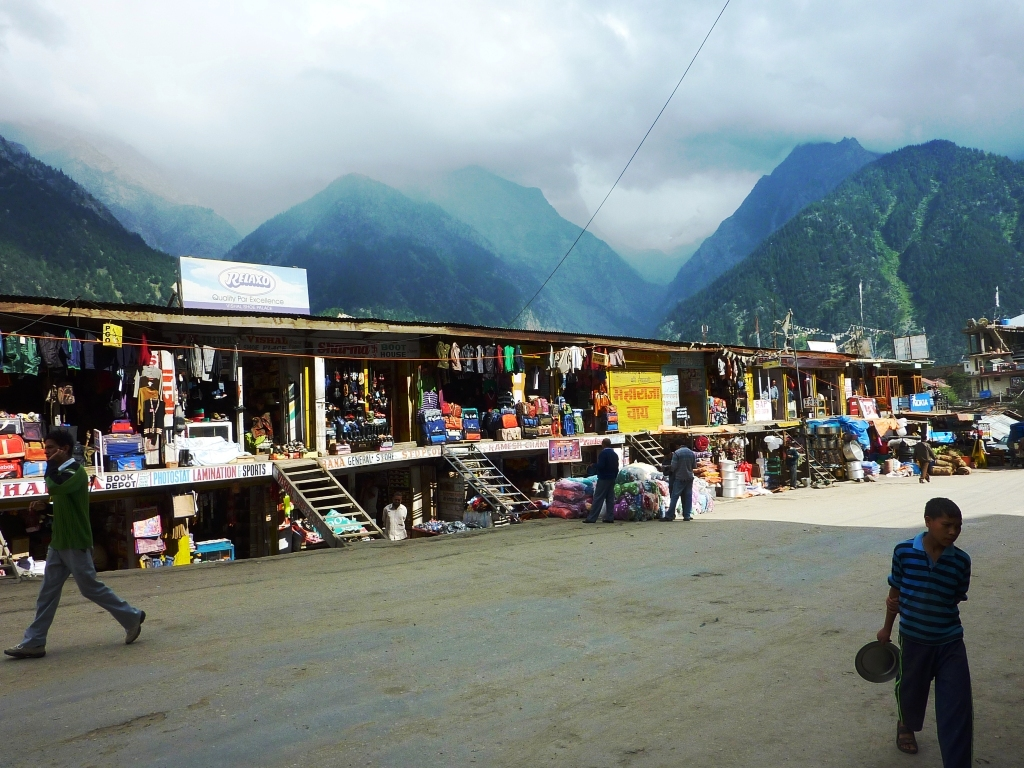
- Main street, Reckong Peo, 2010

- Location in Himachal Pradesh, India Reckong Peo (India)
- Coordinates: 31.540278°N 78.272222°E
- Country: India
- State: Himachal Pradesh
- District: Kinnaur
- Elevation: 2,290 m (7,510 ft)

Population
  - Total: 2,397 (1,529 males 868 females)

Languages
  - Official: Hindi
  - Native: Kinnauri
- Time zone: UTC+5:30 (IST)
- Nearest towns: Bhaba Nagar, Rampur, Kumarsain, Poo, Kaza
- Lok Sabha constituency: Mandi
- Vidhan Sabha constituency: Kinnaur

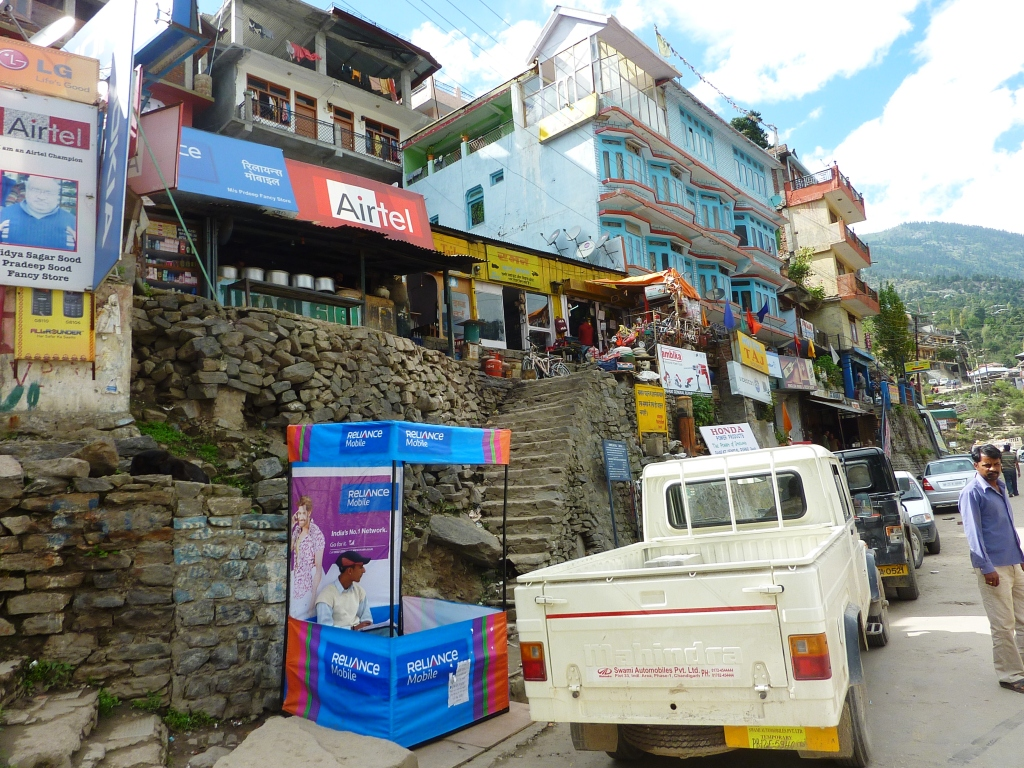
Downtown Rekong Peo

Reckong Peo, also spelled Rekong Peo, and known as Peo by local inhabitants, is headquarters of Kinnaur district, one of the twelve administrative districts of the Indian state of Himachal Pradesh.

At a height of 2,290 metres (7,513 ft), Reckong Peo is 260 kilometers (162 miles) from Shimla and seven kilometers (4⅓ miles) from Powari ― a place on NH5. Earlier Kalpa was the headquarter of the Kinnaur district administration. It was later shifted down to Reckong Peo. The place is named after a group of people who used to own this place in ancient times.

Reckong Peo is a base for pilgrims who annually complete three day treks to an 80 feet tall holy rock pillar, considered to be Lord Shiv or ‘Shivalinga’. Whereas a clockwise ‘Parikrama’ (circumambulation) trek around the holy rock start from Charang village and end at Chitkul after traversing a long and challenging terrain.

Reckong Peo is the commercial and administrative center of the Kinnaur district; the biggest market of the district and all important governmental and administrative offices are located at Reckong Peo. The HRTC Bus Stand at Reckong Peo allows transport within the district.

== Notable locations ==
The primary attractions of Reckong Peo are the Chandi Mata Temple and Bhabha Valley. Apart from Kinnaur Kailash high mountain peak, you can also observe the high mountain peak of Raldang located in Greater Himalayas.

Apple orchards are found in abundance due to favorable climatic conditions. Houses are built traditionally that depict the culture and lifestyle of Himachal Pradesh.

The nearest airport is Kullu Manali Airport, 245 km from Reckong Peo by road.

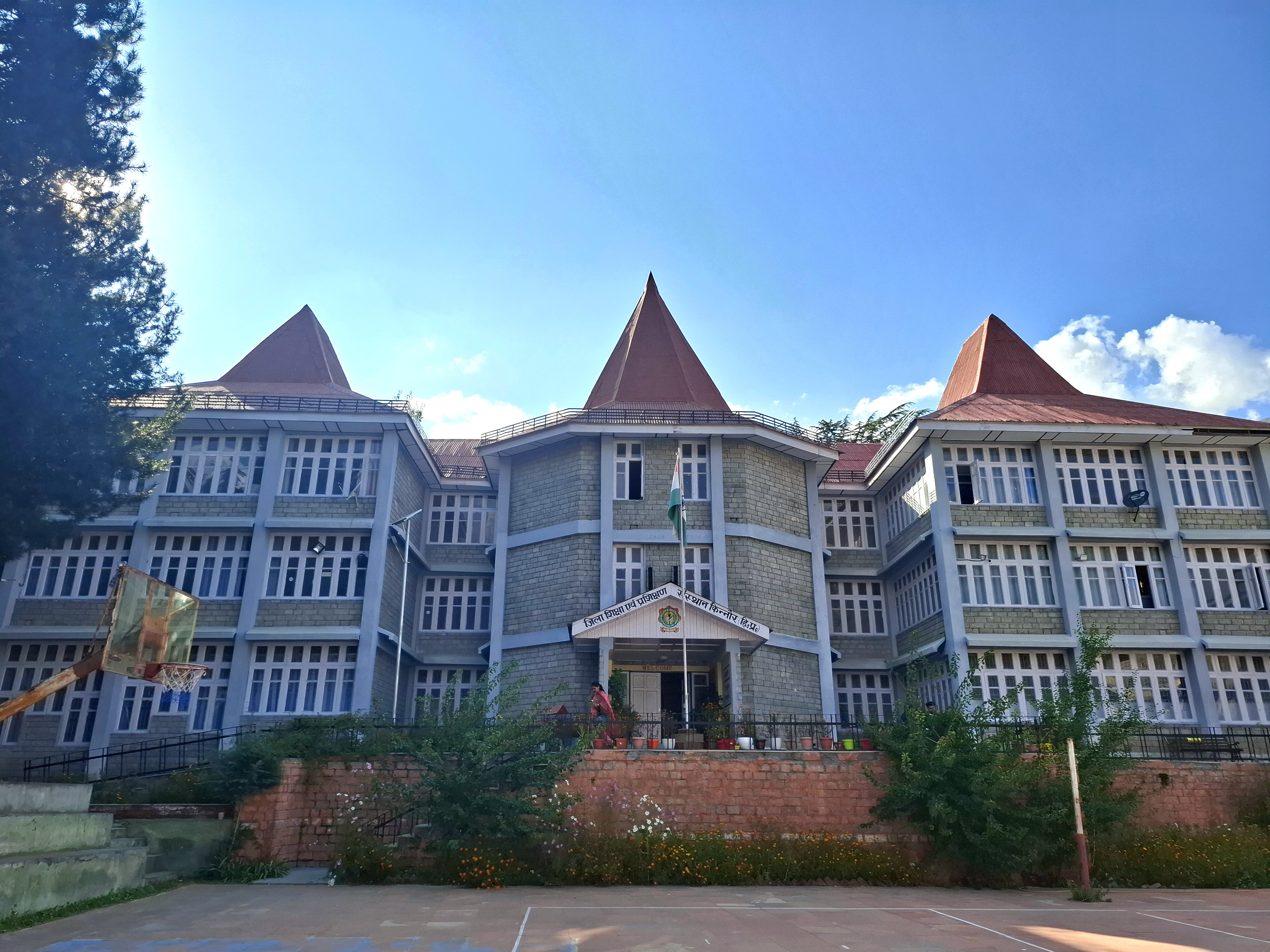
DIET Kinnaur, Reckong Peo

== Gallery ==
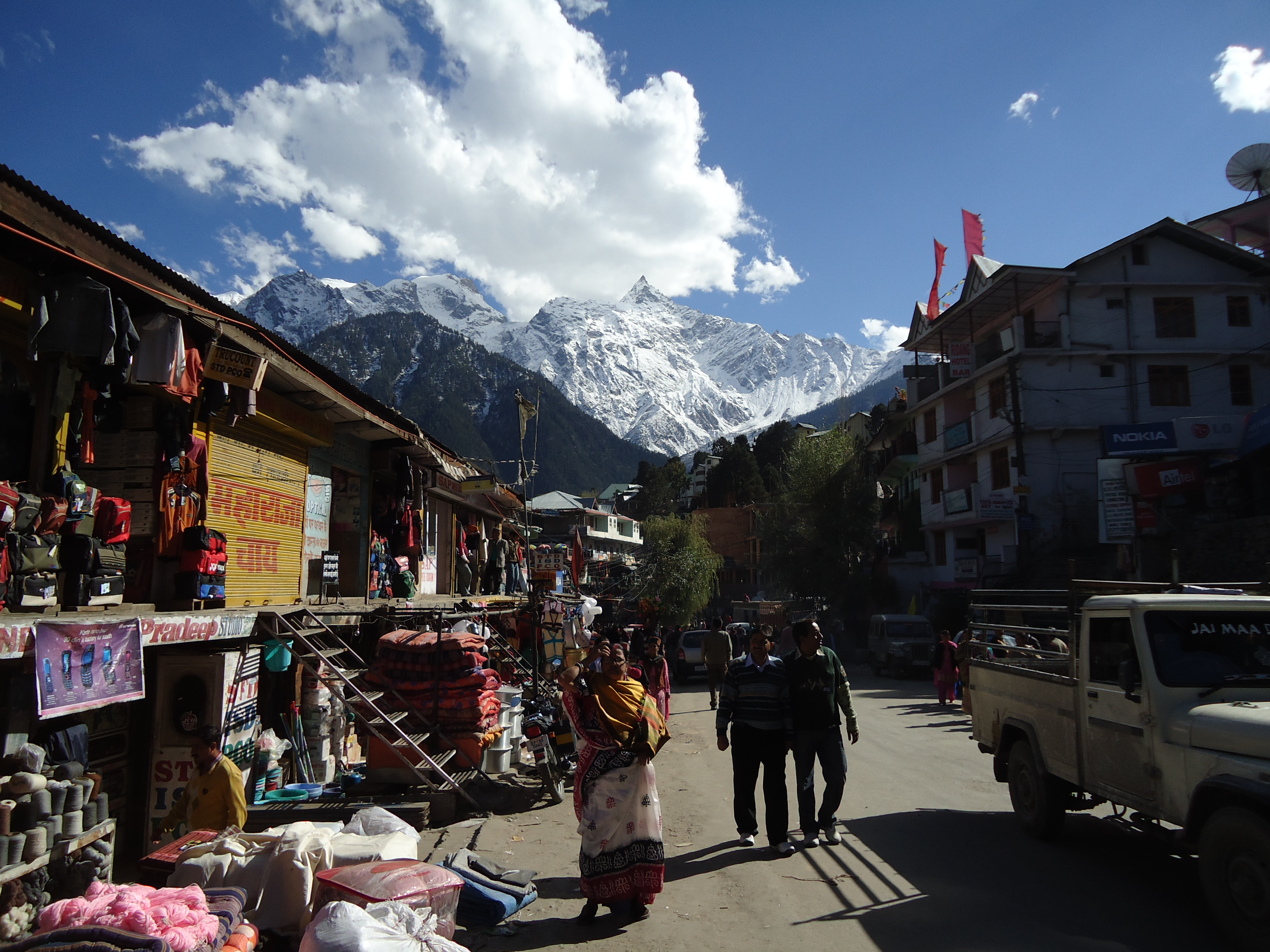
Market in Main street of Reckong Peo, with Kinnaur Kailash in background.

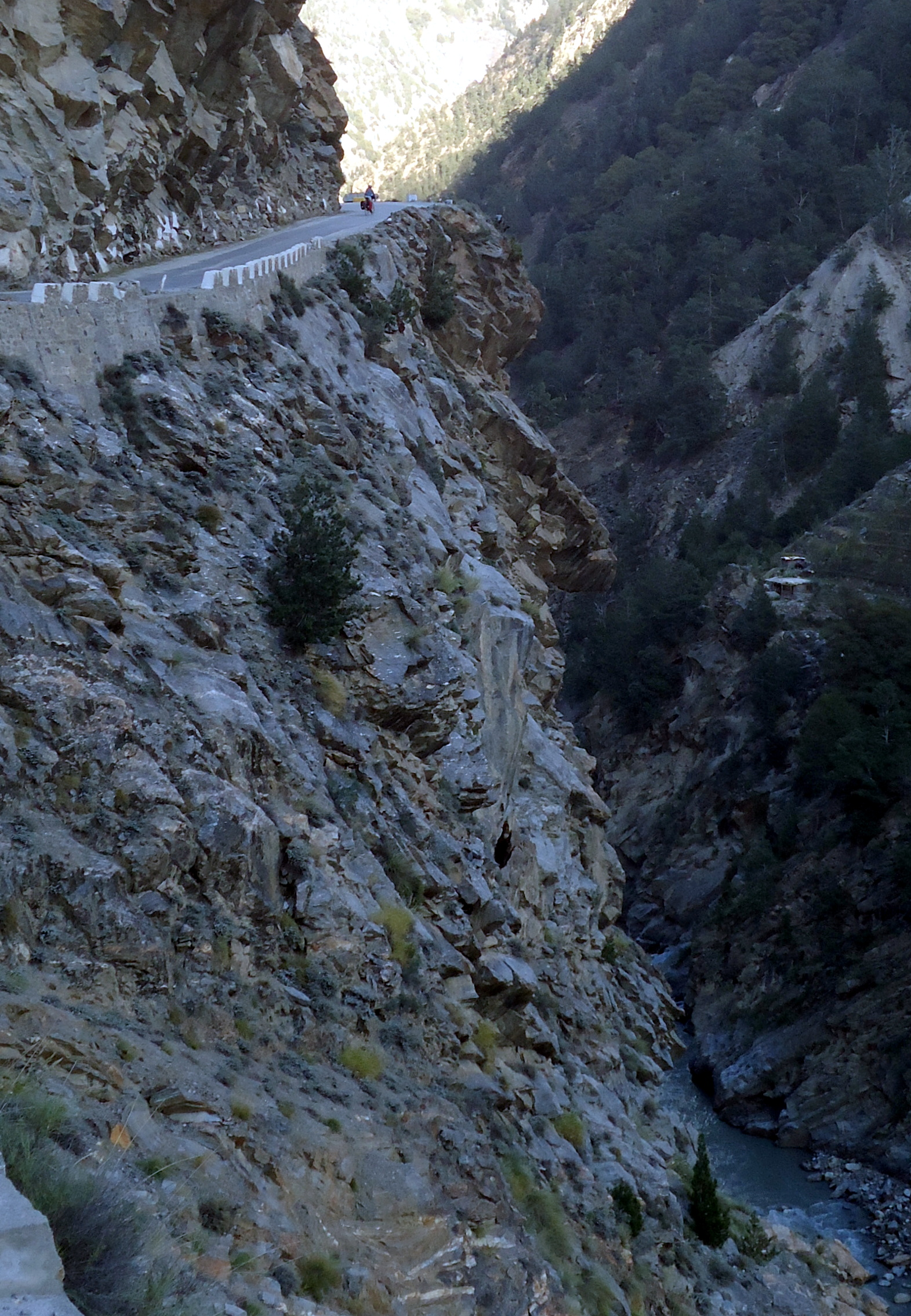
Steep cliffside a few kilometres north of Reckong Peo along the NH22.

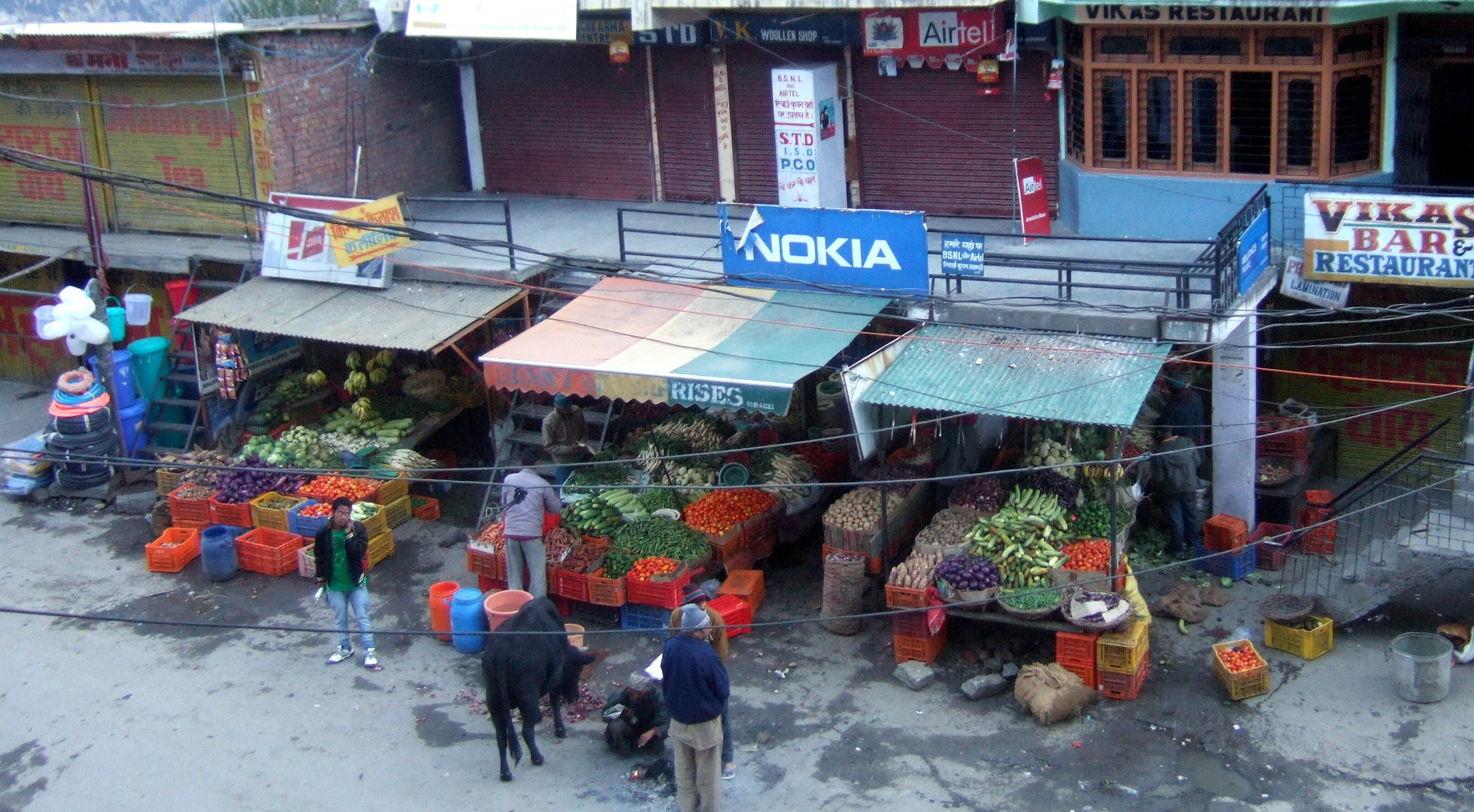
Fruit and vegetable stand in Reckong Peo.

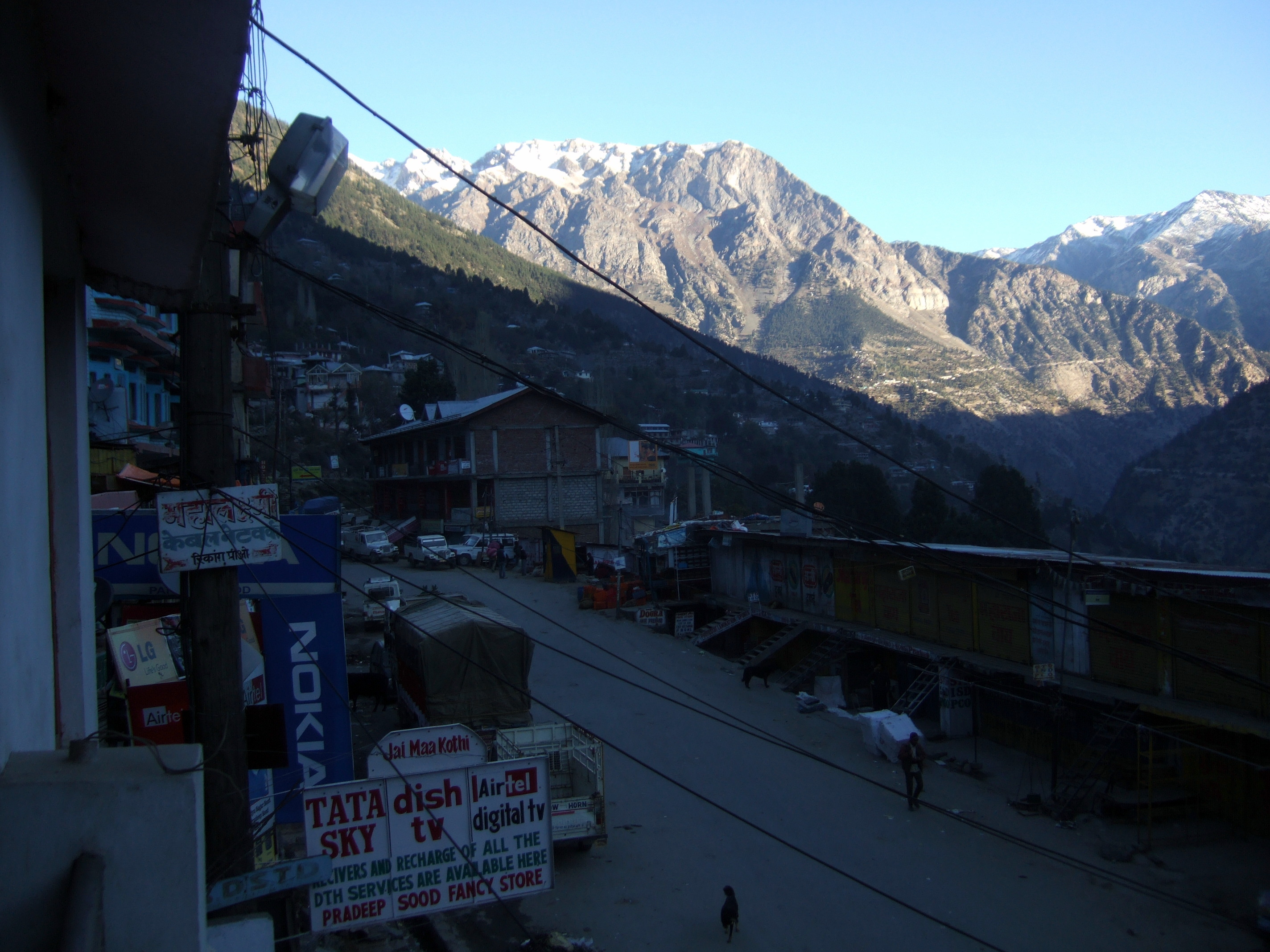

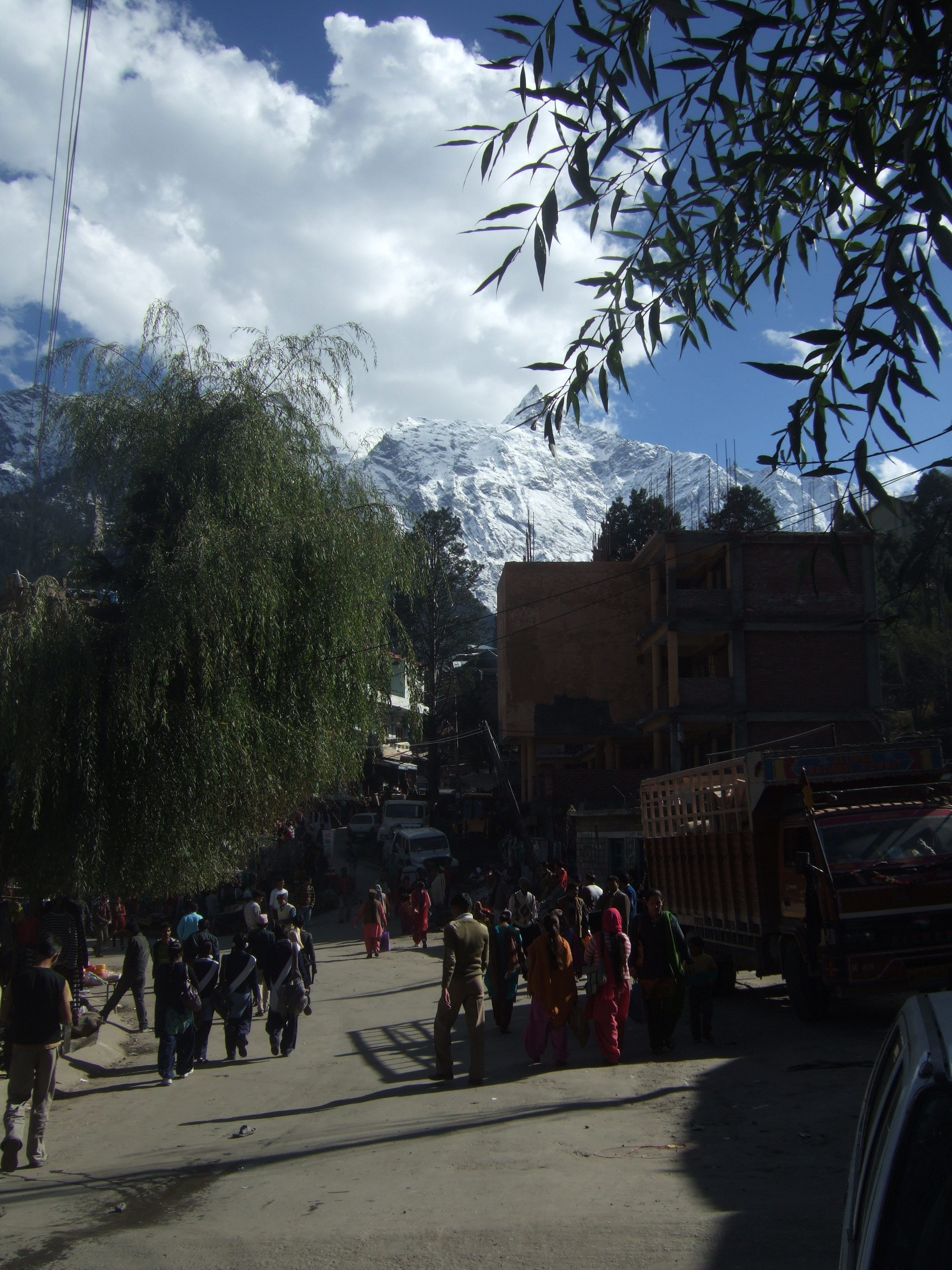

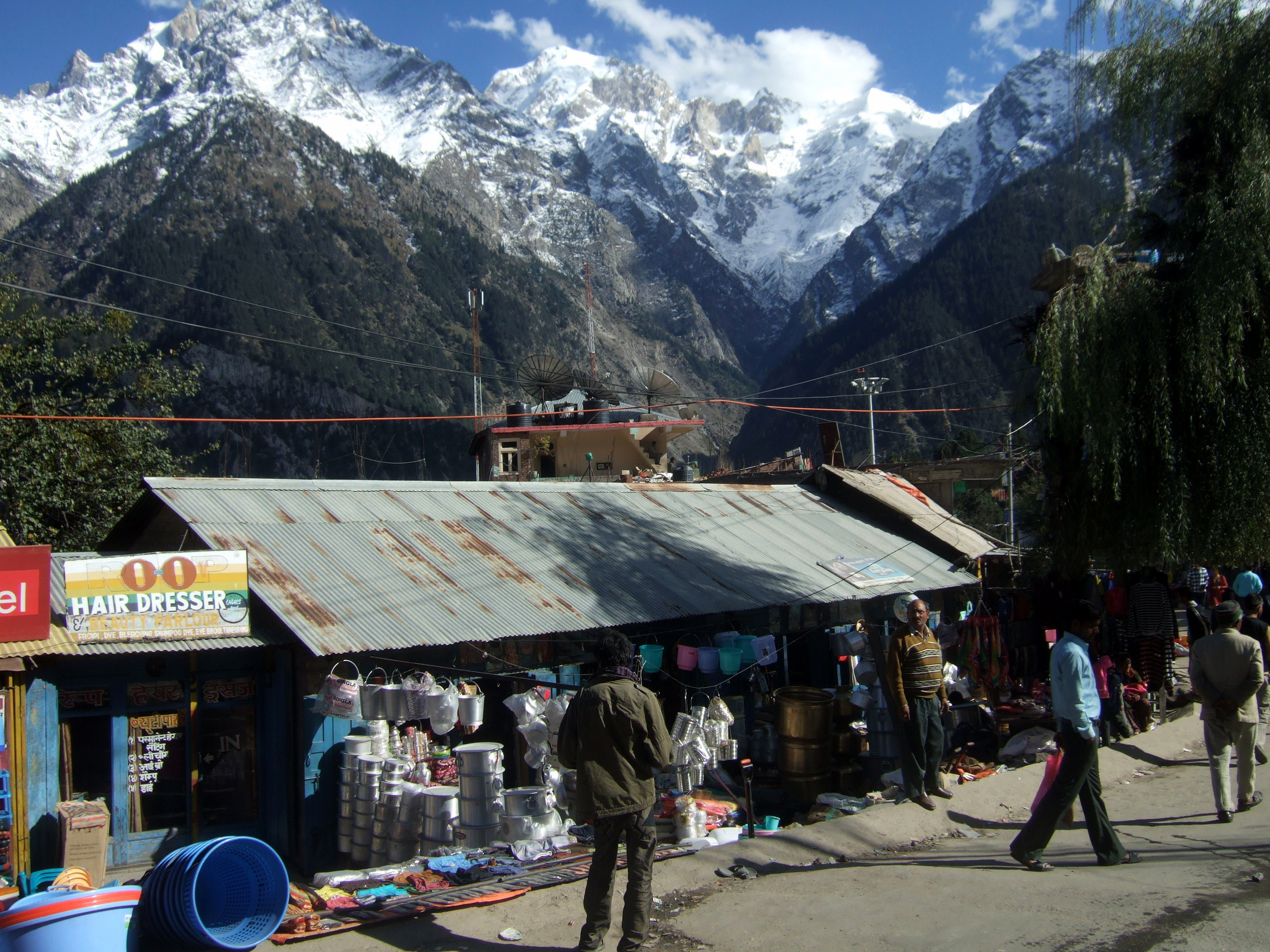

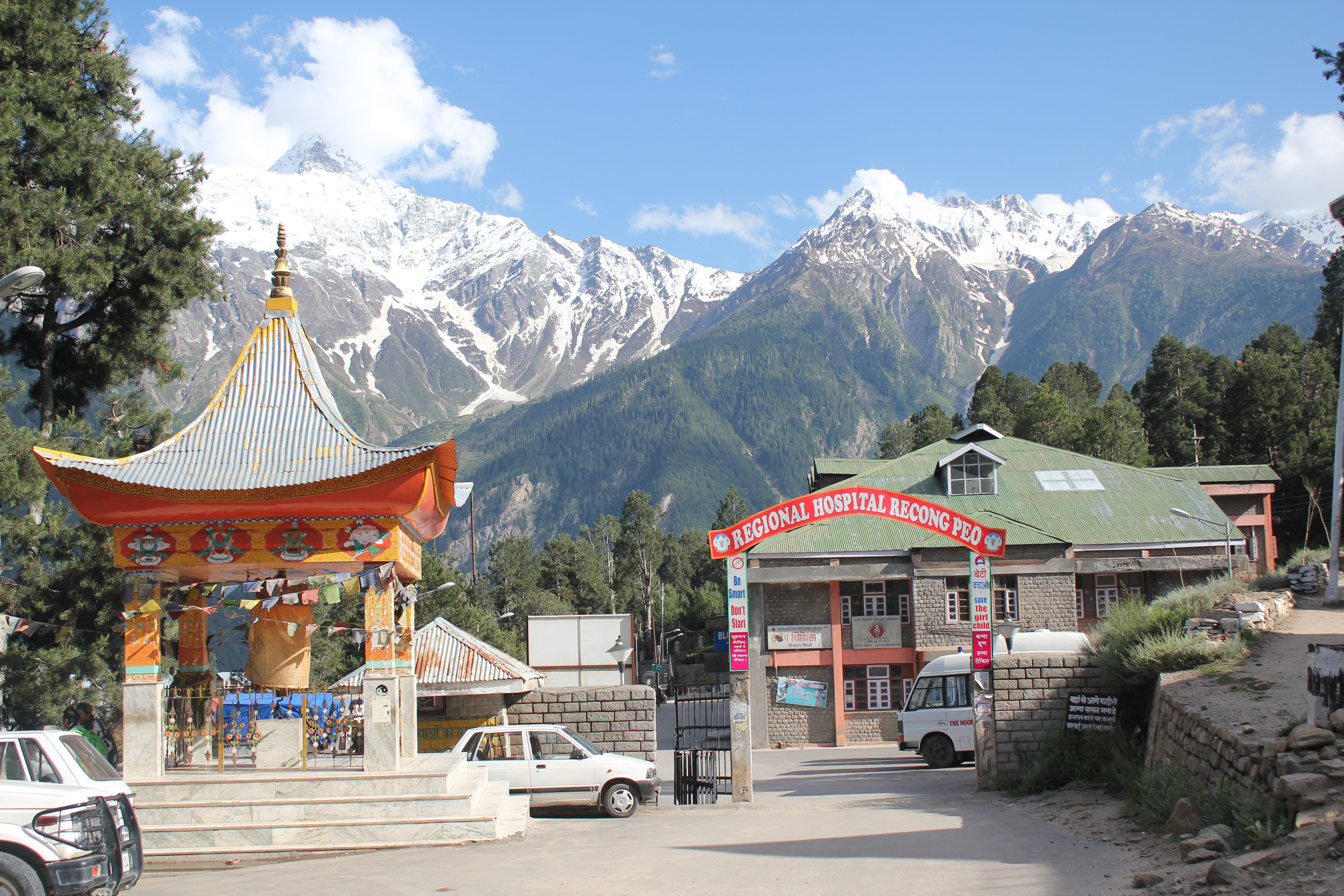
Entrance of Reckong Peo Hospital (2015)
