= Shyam Saran Negi =

First Indian voter (1917–2022)

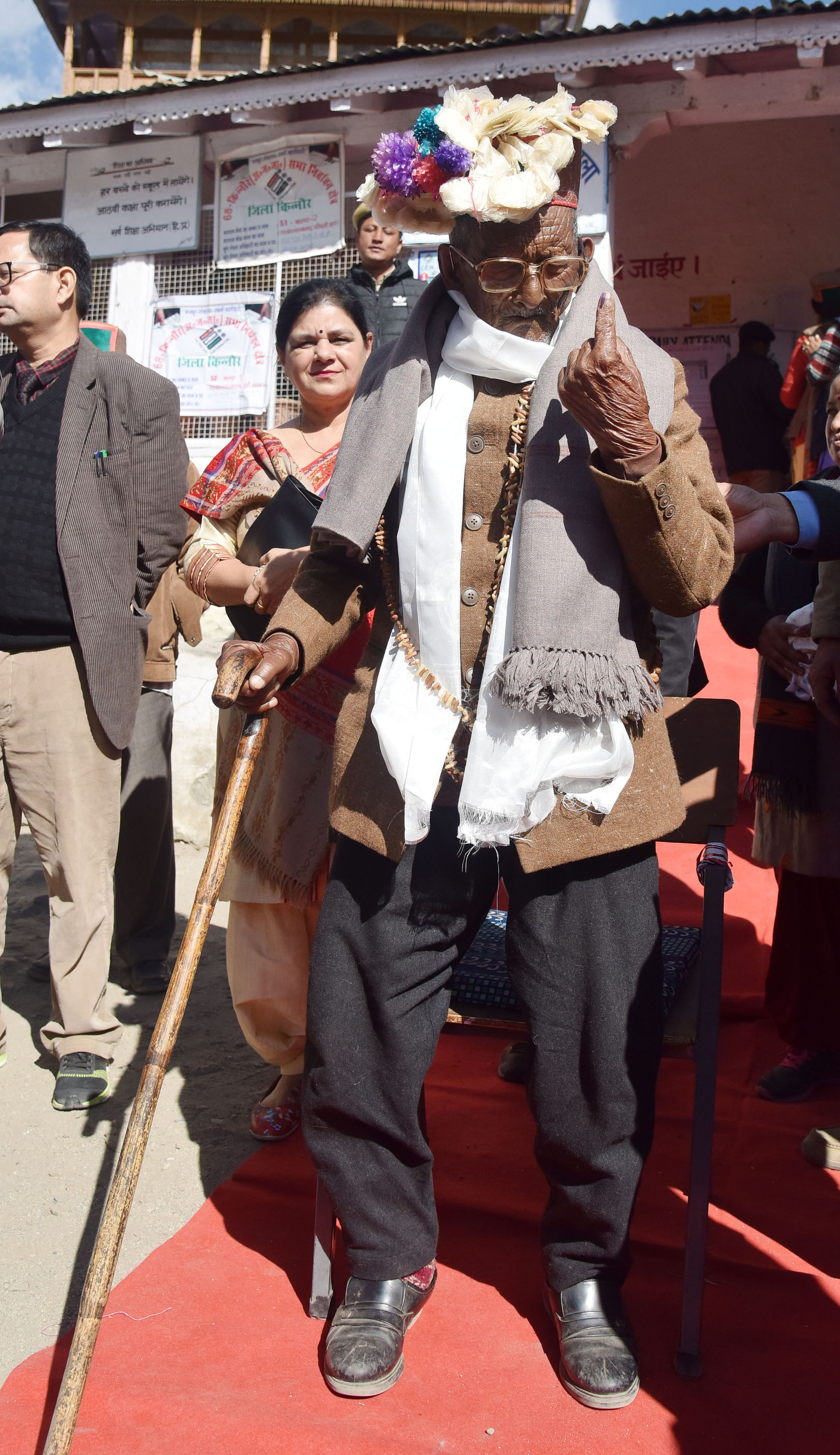
- Shyam Saran Negi after casting his vote for HP Legislative Assembly elections in 2017
- Born: 1 July 1917; Kalpa, Kinnaur, Bushahr State, British Raj (present-day Himachal Pradesh, India)
- Died: 5 November 2022 (aged 105); Kalpa, Kinnaur, India
- Education: Himachal Pradesh University; Panjab University; National School of Drama
- Occupation: Teacher
- Known for: First voter in the Republic of India

Shyam Saran Negi (1 July 1917 – 5 November 2022) was an Indian school teacher in Kalpa, Himachal Pradesh, who cast the first vote in the 1952 general election in India — the first elections of the Republic of India. Although most of the polling for that first election took place in February 1952, Himachal Pradesh went to the polls six months early because the weather there tends to be inclement in February and March and heavy snowfall during that period would have made it impossible for citizens to reach the polling stations. Negi was a member of the polling team and vividly recalled that he cast his first vote in Shonthong polling station and his polling party had to trek long distances to conduct polling in Purvani – Ribba – Moarang – Nesong over a period of 10 days. Negi cast the first vote on 25 October 1951 in favour of the then Congress candidate for Mandi seat, Rajkumari Amrit Kaur. He voted in every general election since 1951 until his death, and is believed to have been India's oldest voter as well as its first. Shyam Saran Negi also made a special appearance in a Hindi film Sanam Re.

Negi died on 5 November 2022, at the age of 105, just three days after casting his 34th vote for the state assembly elections in favour of the BJP candidate Surat Negi. Following the news of his death, the Indian Government announced that Negi would be cremated with full state honours in Kalpa.

== Honours ==
In 2010, the then Chief Election Commissioner of India, Navin Chawla, visited Negi's village to honour him as part of the Election Commission's diamond jubilee celebrations.

In 2014, Google India produced a public service announcement in which Negi told of his participation in independent India's first election, and reminded viewers of the importance of voting.
