= Rope incense =

Type of incense from the Tibet region

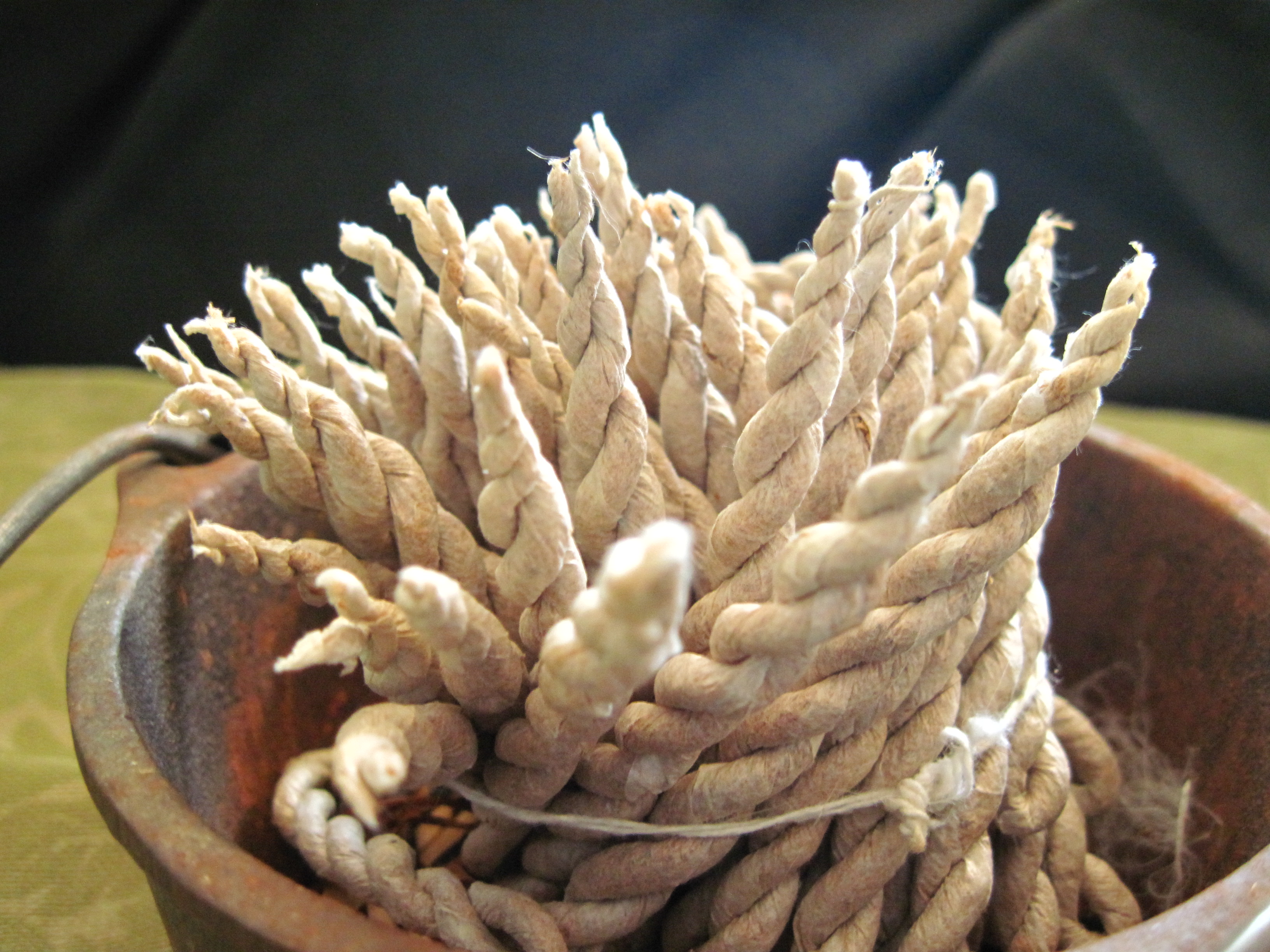
Tibetan rope or twist style stickless incense, pictured in a cast-iron miniature cauldron in which such incense can be safely burned.

Rope incense or Tibetan incense is made in Tibet, Northern parts of Nepal, and Bhutan. Incense is an important representation of the Tibetan culture. These incenses have a characteristic "earthy" or herbal scent to them. Rope incenses can contain 30 or more ingredients. Like most Asian incense, Tibetan incense is extruded into lengths or coils, rather than rolled around a bamboo stick. The incense is known as bateko dhoop (lit. braided incense) in Nepali language and is used as an alternative to stick incense.

== Medicine ==
In Tibetan medicine, incense is regarded as a way of treatment for various ailments. This information can be found in Tibetan medical books which originated from the four Tantras (Root Tantra, Tantra of Enlightenment, Tantra of Instructions, Concluding Tantra) which is also known as rGyudbzhi in Tibetan. It is the central work upon which contemporary Tibetan medicine is based. Tibetan medical theory states that everything in the universe is made up of the 5 proto-elements: sa (earth), chu (water), me (fire), rLung (wind or air), and Nam-mkha (space). But only four play a role in the classification of our illnesses, except Nam-mkha. Each element contains eight active forces and 17 qualities. Some of these elements are contained in our three bodily energies and their imbalance affects the equilibrium of the three 'fluids' (rLung, mkhrispa and badkan).

== Production ==
Authentic Tibetan incense originates from traditional monastery or medical college/hospital formulations, so Tibetan incense follows a particular lineage which can be traced back to a source. Over the years, Tibetan incense-making has become polluted and over-commercialized, leading to incense formulation by non-authentic makers. This has affected and degenerated the Tibetan incense formulation and making methods to a certain degree, which forms an important part of the unique Tibetan culture. However, there are still some in parts of Nepal and Bhutan that produce Tibetan incense in an authentic manner, by using authentic Himalayan herbs and ingredients.
