= Kinnaur Kailash =

Mountain peak in Kinnaur district

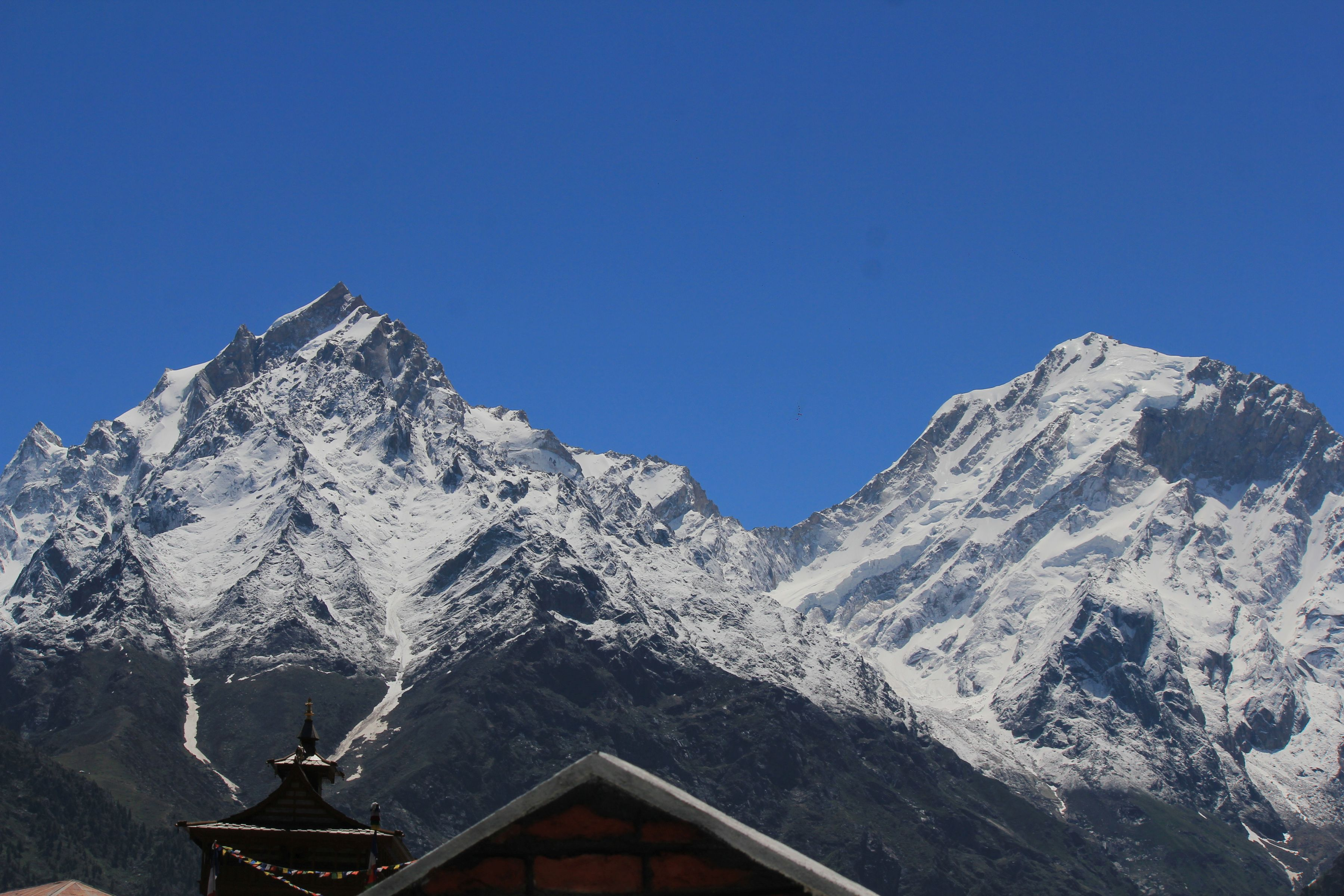
- Mount Kinner Kailash (left; 6,055 m (19,865 ft)) and Jorkanden (right; 6,473 m (21,237 ft))

Highest point
- Elevation: 6,055 m (19,865 ft)
- Prominence: 550 m (1,800 ft)
- Coordinates: 31°31′14″N 78°21′49″E

Geography
- Location within Himachal Pradesh Location within India
- Location: Himachal Pradesh, India
- Country: India
- Parent range: Himalayas

Satellite view of the Kinnaur Kailash (draped over SRTM digital elevation model)

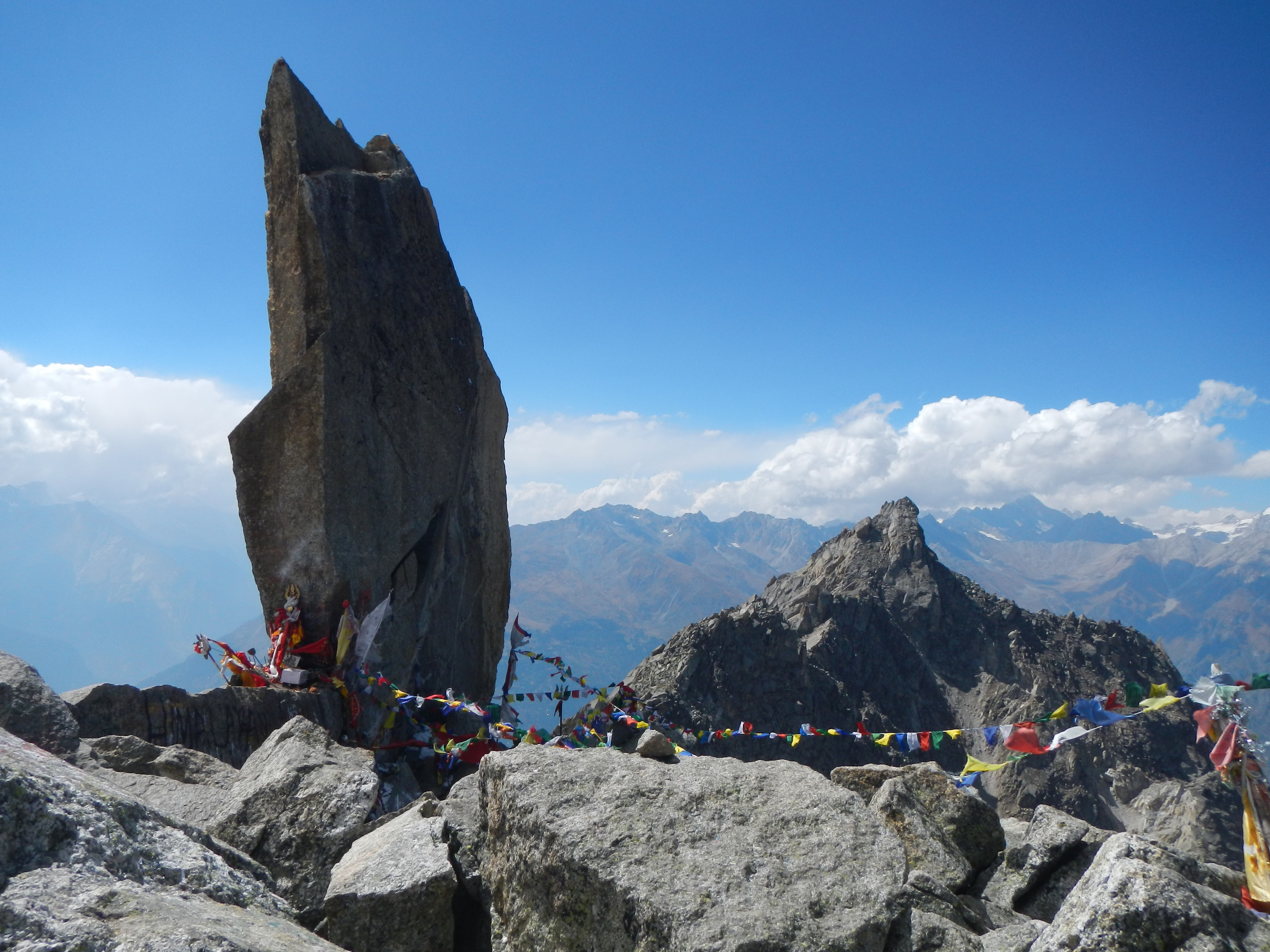
Picture of Shivling (monolithic pillar) at 4800m overlooking the valley

The Kinnaur Kailasha (locally known as Kinner Kailash) is a mountain in the Kinnaur district of the Indian state of Himachal Pradesh. As per Hindu scriptures, Lord Shiva and goddess Parvati reside in Kinner Kailash. It is the fourth most important peak among the group of five separate peaks in Himalayas in separate locations collectively known as the Panch Kailash or "Five Kailashas", other being Mount Kailash in first place, Adi Kailash in second, Shikhar Kailash (Shrikhand Mahadev Kailash) in third, and Manimahesh Kailash in fifth place in terms of importance. As a result, it is deeply revered by Hindus. Kinnaur Kailash peak has a height of 6050 meters and is considered sacred by both Hindu and Buddhist Kinnauris. This mountain is sometimes confused with the Mount Kailash in China.

The monolithic pillar (Shivling) is located at an altitude of around 4800 meters.

== Geography ==
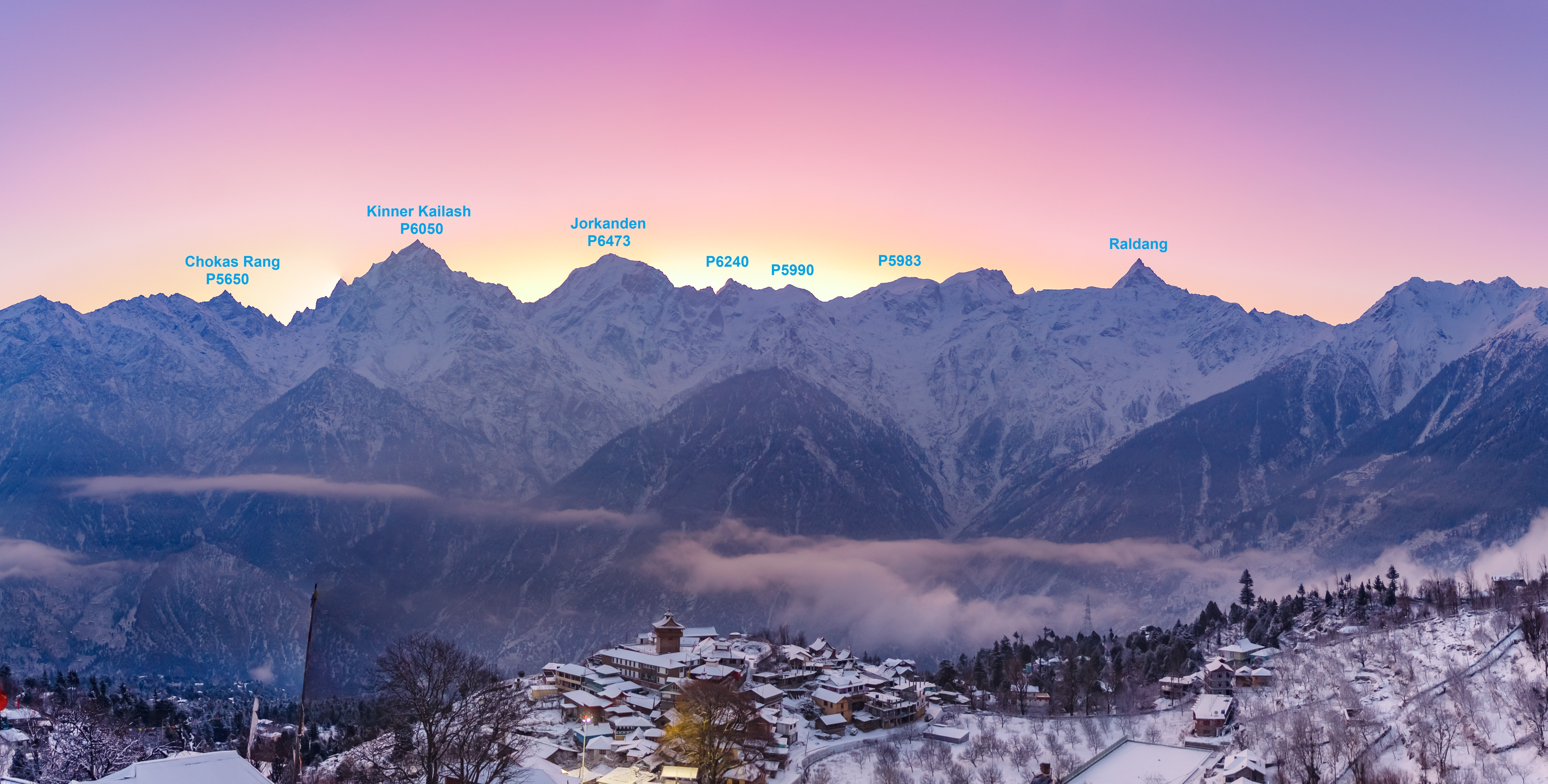

The Kinnaur Kailash Range borders the district of Kinnaur in the south and is dominated by Jorkanden (elevation- 6473m) peaks. Jorkanden is the highest peak in the Kinner-Kailash range.

== See also ==
- Panch Kailash, lit. "Five Kailashas" referring to five scared mountains named Kailash
- Sri Kailash, sixth mountain named Kailash which in not among the Panch Kailash
- Om Parvat
- Om beach
