= Baspa Valley =

River valley in the Kinnaur District of Himachal Pradesh, India

Coordinates: 31.425°N 78.260°E

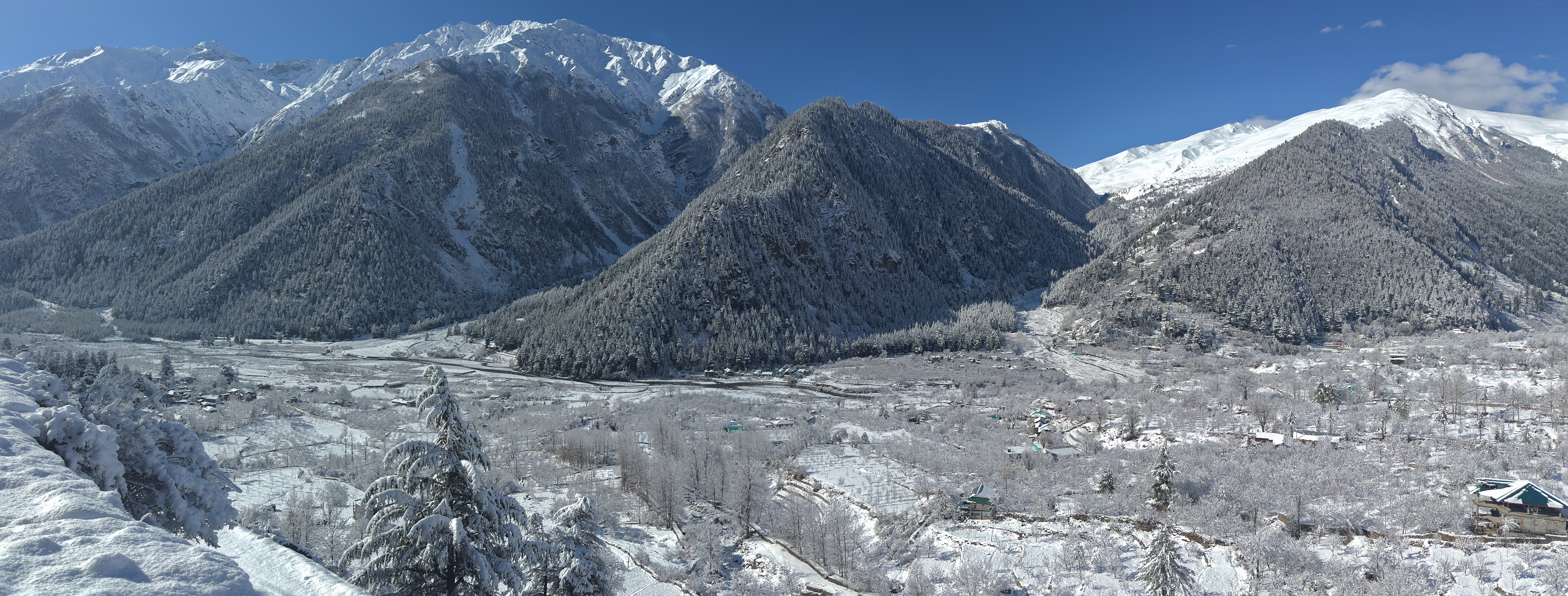
Baspa Valley under snow near Sangla

Baspa Valley is a river valley that lies in the Kinnaur District of Himachal Pradesh, India. It is named after the Baspa River. The town of Sangla is a major town in the valley. The valley is also known as the Sangla Valley or Tukpa Valley. The villages inside the valley is Chitkul, Rakchham, Batseri, Sangla, Kamru; the old capital of Bushahr State and Chansu. It has often been praised for its beauty.

== Geography ==
The Baspa river is a tributary to the Sutlej river, and one may approach the Baspa Valley by taking a diversion at Karcham, which is in the entrance of valley at NH-05. It opens into Satluj valley downstream of tshong-tong river. Baspa valley offers numerous trekking trails to neighbouring valleys like Jalandrigad valley via Lamkhaga pass, Har ki dun valley via Borasu pass, Sangla to Netwar via Rupin pass and Pabbar valley via Buran pass. Yamrang la pass & Gugairang La are the two passes situated on Indo-China border. Most of the annual run off the Baspa River is derived from glacier and snowmelt.

== History ==
In 1819, Patrick and Alexander Gerard, Scottish brothers and explorers, visited the valley and wrote that it was "the most beautiful of all Himalayan valleys" and such descriptions have often been used by visitors to the valley since then. Baspa River has a 300 MW hydroelectric power project at Karcham. The barrage for the project is at Kuppa (Kamru). The project has been operational since May 2003. Jaypee Group, a private sector conglomerate, built the project and later sold it to Jindal Power.

=== Legend ===
According to a local legend related to the origin of the Baspa Valley,

[Nag Devta, preceding deity of Sangla,] came to the valley from across the Dhauladhars and found the Narayan already holding sway above Sangla area, which at that time was still under a lake. A contest was arranged to decide whether the Nag could also reside in the valley. The Narayan assumed the form of a cat and Nag became a rat. Both entered the lake, with the cat in hot pursuit. The rat burrowed his way through the rocks at Ruttrang to escape. The lake drained out and the Nag won his right to stay in his temple in the middle of Sangla.

== Tourism ==
Some of the most picturesque villages in the Himalayas can be found here, including the tourist habitations of Sangla, Rakchham, and Chitkul.

== Transport ==
The 40-km long Kharcham-Sangla-Rakchham-Chitkul section of under construction 150 km long Karcham-Harshil Road runs along the Baspa River from Kharcham, later of which begins from Karcham NH-5 will have a road tunnel under the Lamkhaga Pass.

== See also ==
- Sangla Valley, part of Baspa River Valley where Baspa River flows by the Sangla habitation
- Chitkuli Kinnauri language, spoken in Baspa River Valley
- Liar's Dice (film), story set around Baspa River Valley

== Bibliography ==
- Bajpai, Shiva Chandra (1981), Kinnaur in the Himalaya: Mythology to Modernity, Concept Publishing Company, ISBN 81-7022-180-3
- Sanan, Deepak; Swadi, Dhanu (1998), Exploring Kinnaur and Spiti in the trans-Himalaya, Indus Publishing Company, ISBN 81-7387-074-8
