= Baspa River =

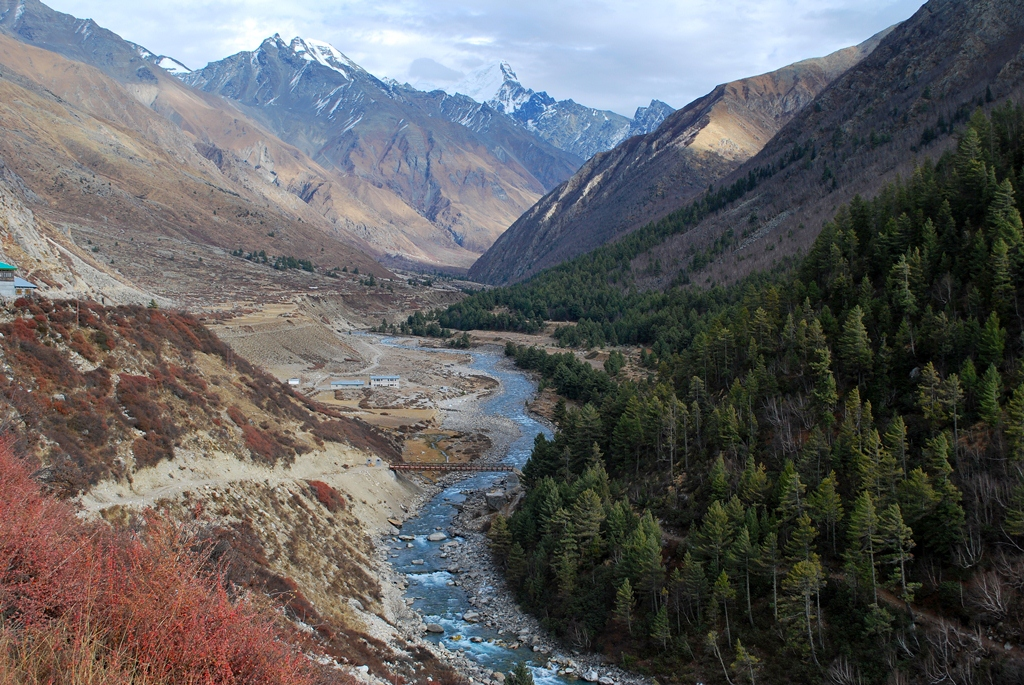
- Baspa River flowing next to Chitkul

- Location of mouth in India

Location
- Countries: India
- State: Himachal Pradesh
- District: Kinnaur

Physical characteristics
- Mouth
  - coordinates: 31°29′49″N 78°10′51″E

Baspa River is a river flowing through the Indian Himalayas in the northern Indian state of Himachal Pradesh. It rises near the Indo-Tibetan border and forms the scenic Baspa Valley (also known as the Sangla Valley) before flowing into the Sutlej River from the left bank near Karchham, where the Karcham Wangtoo Hydroelectric Plant is located on it.

== Geography ==
The Vally runs from Chung Sakhago Pass to Karcham. The Chung Sakhago Pass lies at the head of the valley. It is fed by the perennial glaciers and shares the catchment area with the headwaters of the Ganges. Only the lower half of the 95 kilometers length of the valley is inhabited - all the way from Chitkul (3,475 m) to where the Baspa meets the Sutlej River at Karcham (1,830 m). Though gentle most of the way, it would be difficult to raft the Baspa as some stretches have sheer falls.

== Ecology ==
The upper and middle slopes of the valley along the river are covered with pine and oak forests. Pastures, meadows and fields cover the lower slopes.

== Tourism ==
Some of the most picturesque villages in the Himalayas can be found here, including the tourist habitations of Sangla, Rakchham, and Chitkul.

== Transport ==
The 40-km long Kharcham-Sangla-Rakchham-Chitkul section of under construction 150 km long Karcham-Harshil Road runs along the Baspa River from Kharcham, later of which begins from Karcham NH-5 will have a road tunnel under the Lamkhaga Pass.

== See also ==
- Baspa Valley
- Sangla Valley, part of Baspa River Valley where Baspa River flows by the Sangla habitation
- Chitkuli Kinnauri language, spoken in Baspa River Valley
- Liar's Dice (film), story set around Baspa River Valley
