= Rakchham Chitkul Wildlife Sanctuary =

Coordinates: 31°21′N 78°24′E

- IUCN category IV (habitat/species management area)
- Location within Himachal Pradesh Location within India
- Interactive map of Rakchham Chitkul Wildlife Sanctuary
- Location: Kinnaur district, Himachal Pradesh, India
- Area: 304 km^{2} (117 sq mi)
- Established: 1989

Rakchham Chitkul Wildlife Sanctuary is a protected area located in Sangla valley of the Kinnaur district of Himachal Pradesh, India. It is situated in the arid zone of the middle Himalayas. It covers the area of 304 km^{2}. The Sanctuary is named after the villages of Rakchham and Chitkul, the latter being the last inhabited village near the Indo-Tibetan border. The sanctuary is home to wildlife, including the Snow Leopard, Himalayan Black Bear, Musk Deer, and Blue Sheep, alongside birds like the Himalayan Monal.
