= Batseri =

Batseri बटसेरी
- Location in Himachal Pradesh
- Coordinates: 31.408°N 78.304°E
- Country: India
- State: Himachal Pradesh
- District: Kinnaur district

Population (2011)
  - Total: 471

Languages
  - Official: Kinnauri, Hindi
- Time zone: UTC+5:30 (IST)

Batseri is a village in Sangla Valley in the Kinnaur district of Himachal Pradesh state of India.

== Gallery ==
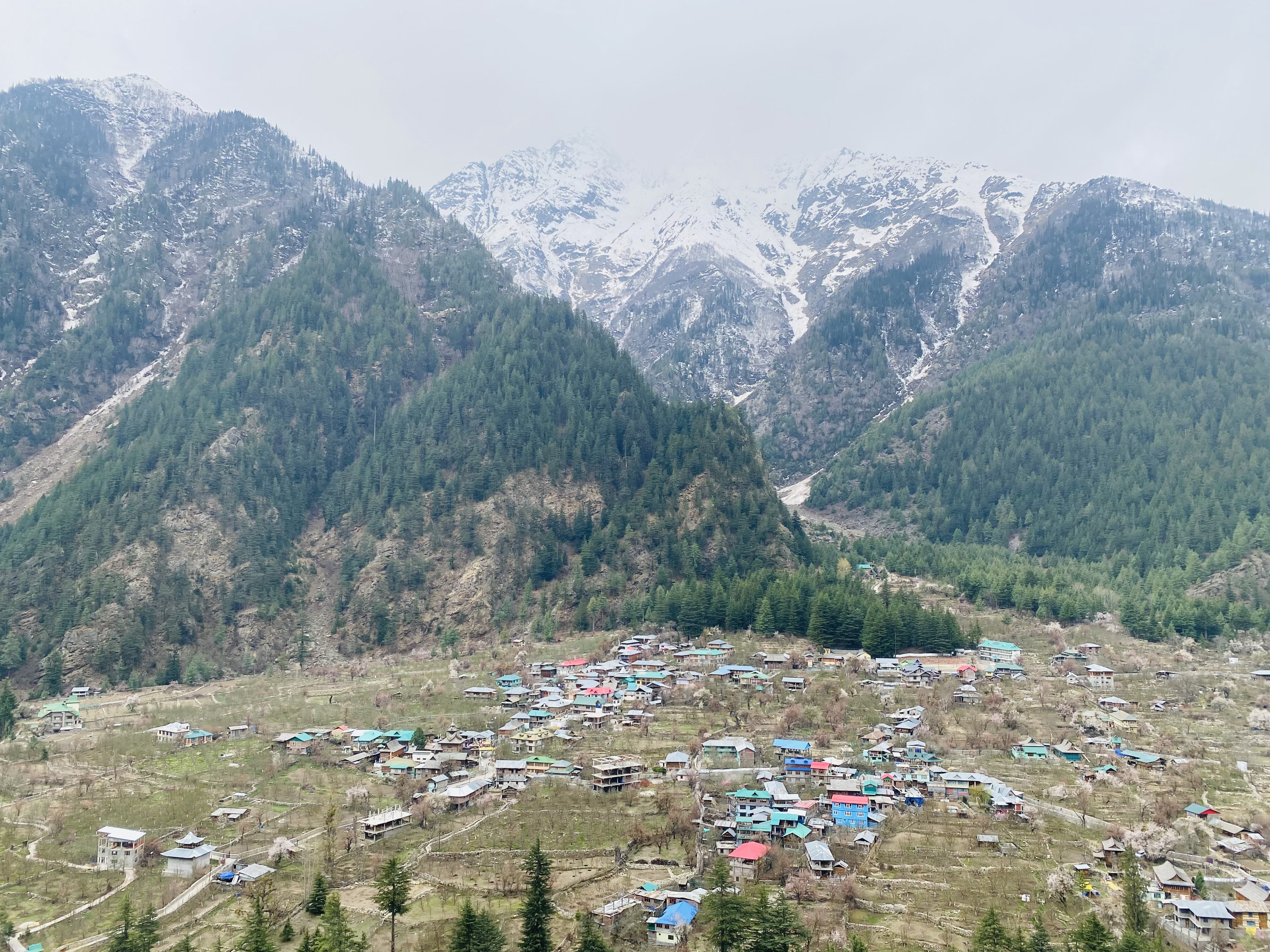
Batseri Village View while descending village from Sangla-Chitkul ROad

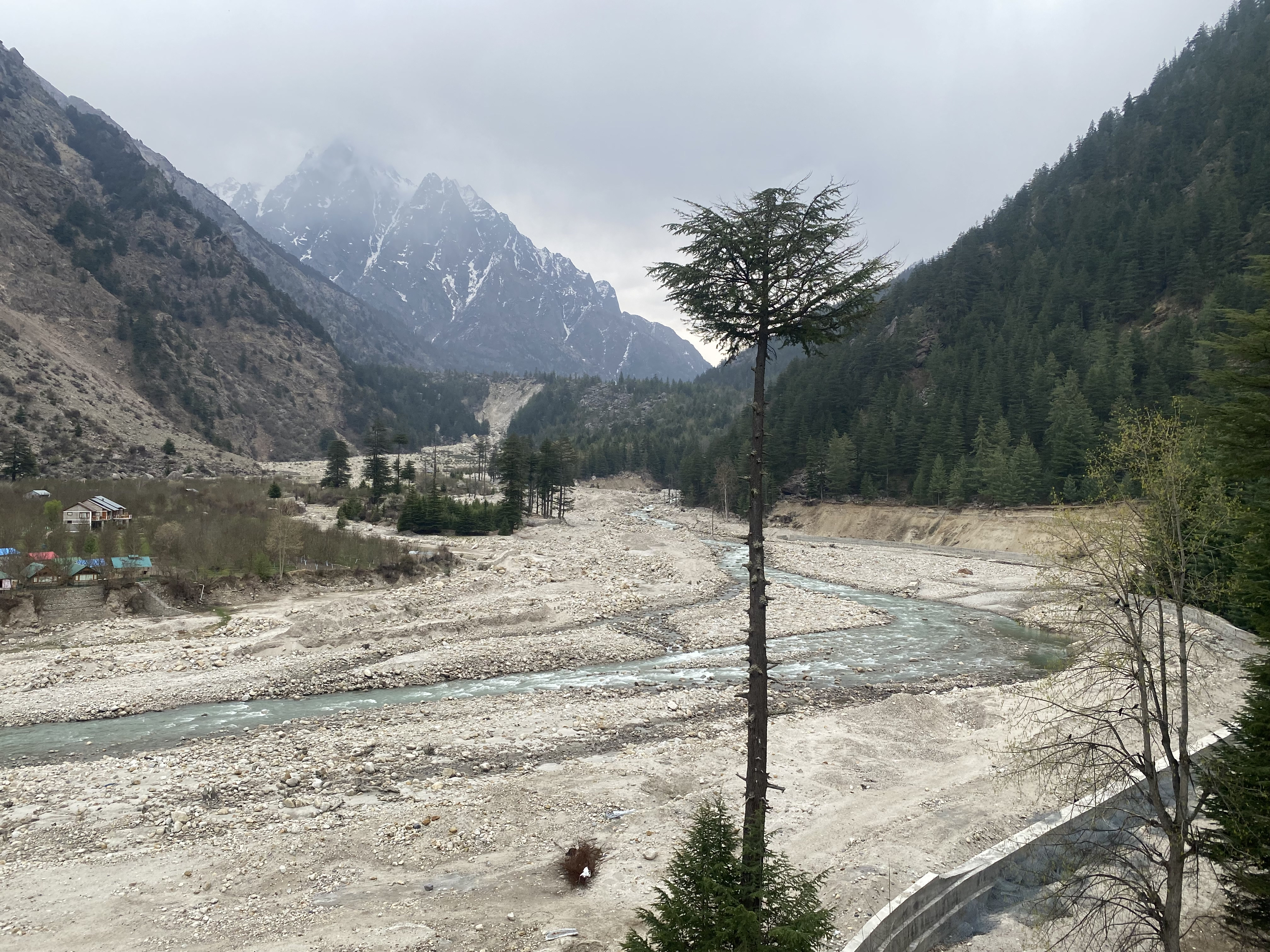
River Baspa from Batseri Village

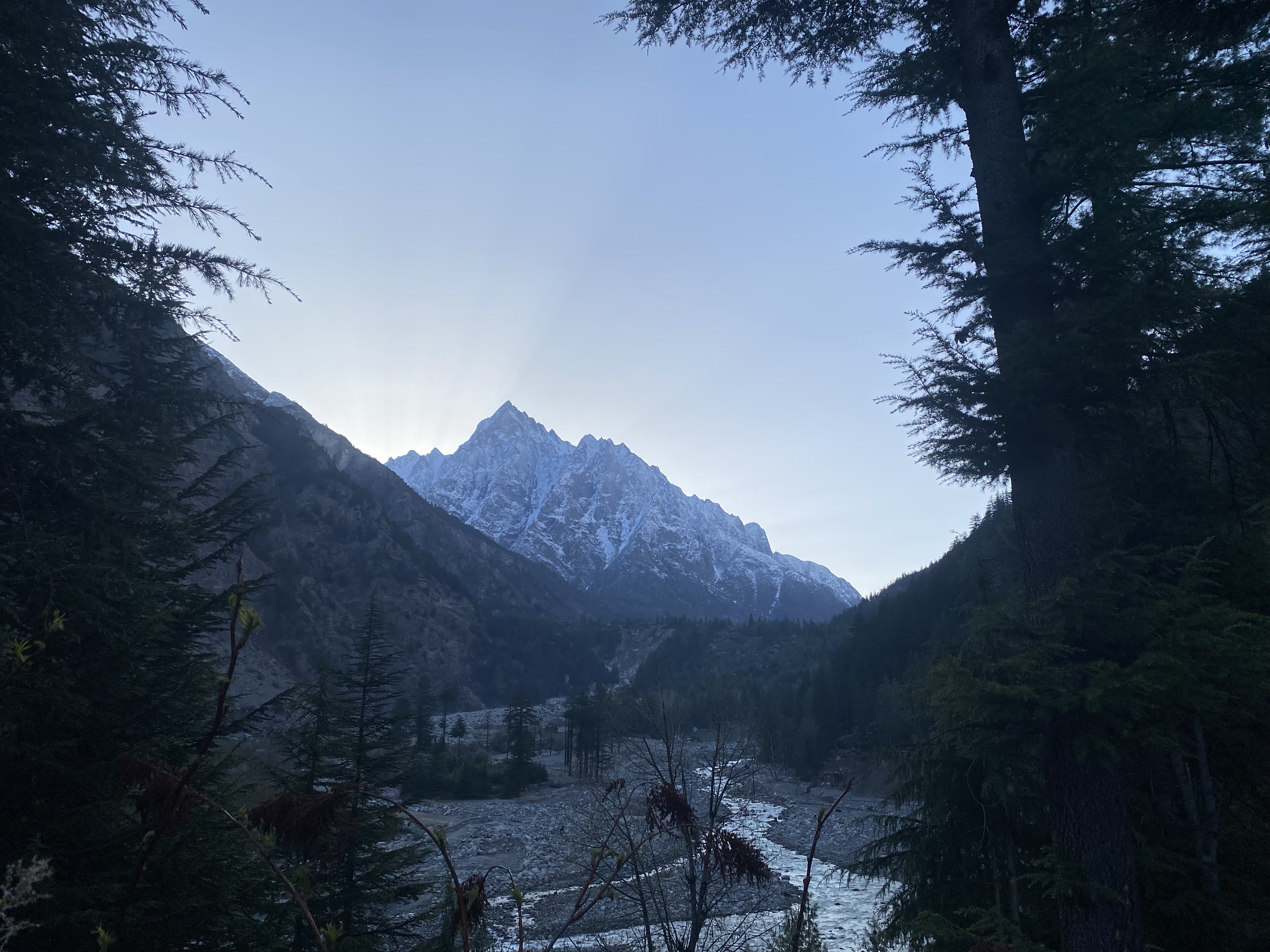
Morning River Baspa from Batseri Village near Chitkul in with SNow Capped Mountain

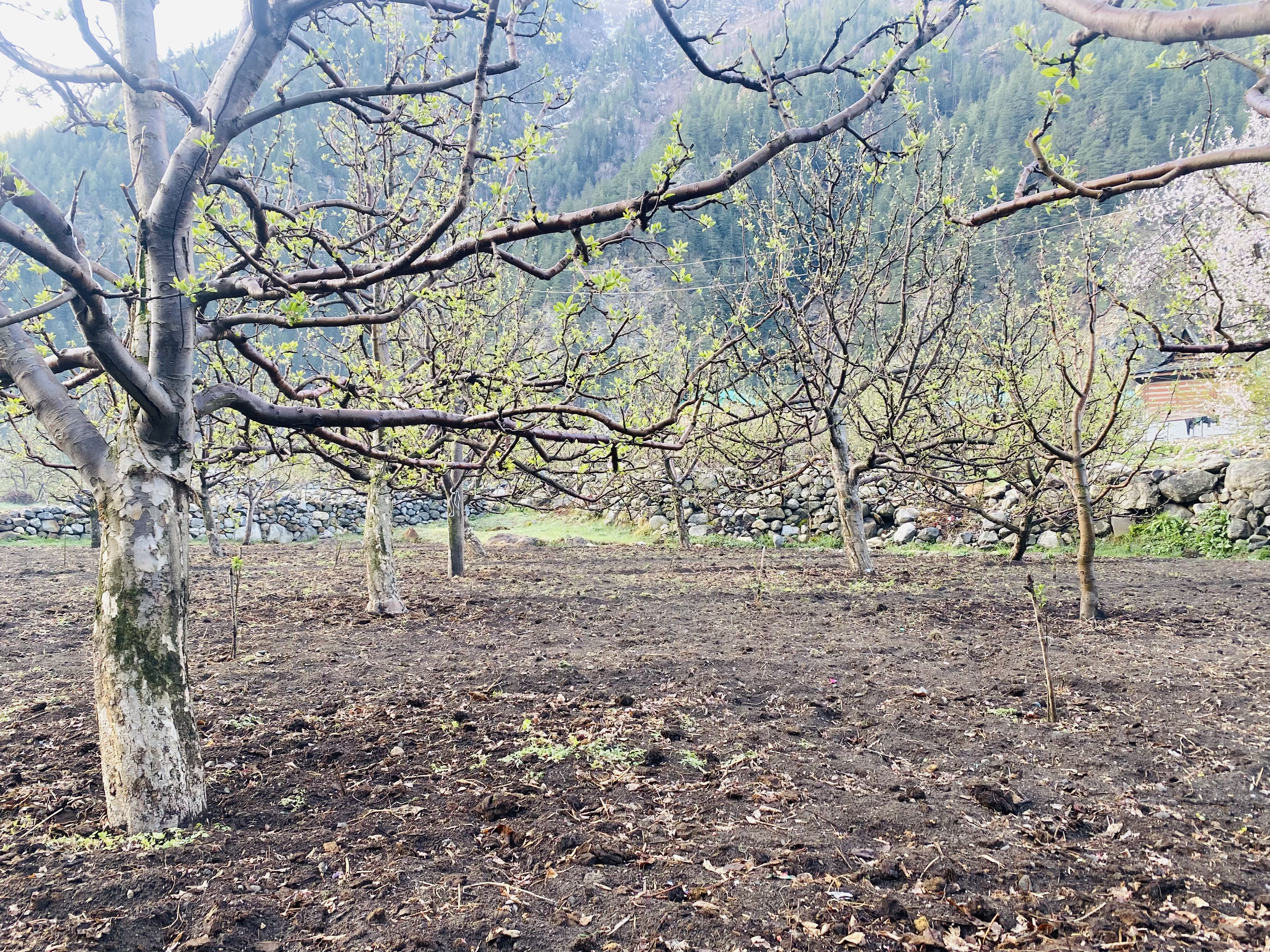
Apple Orchards begin Farming April 10

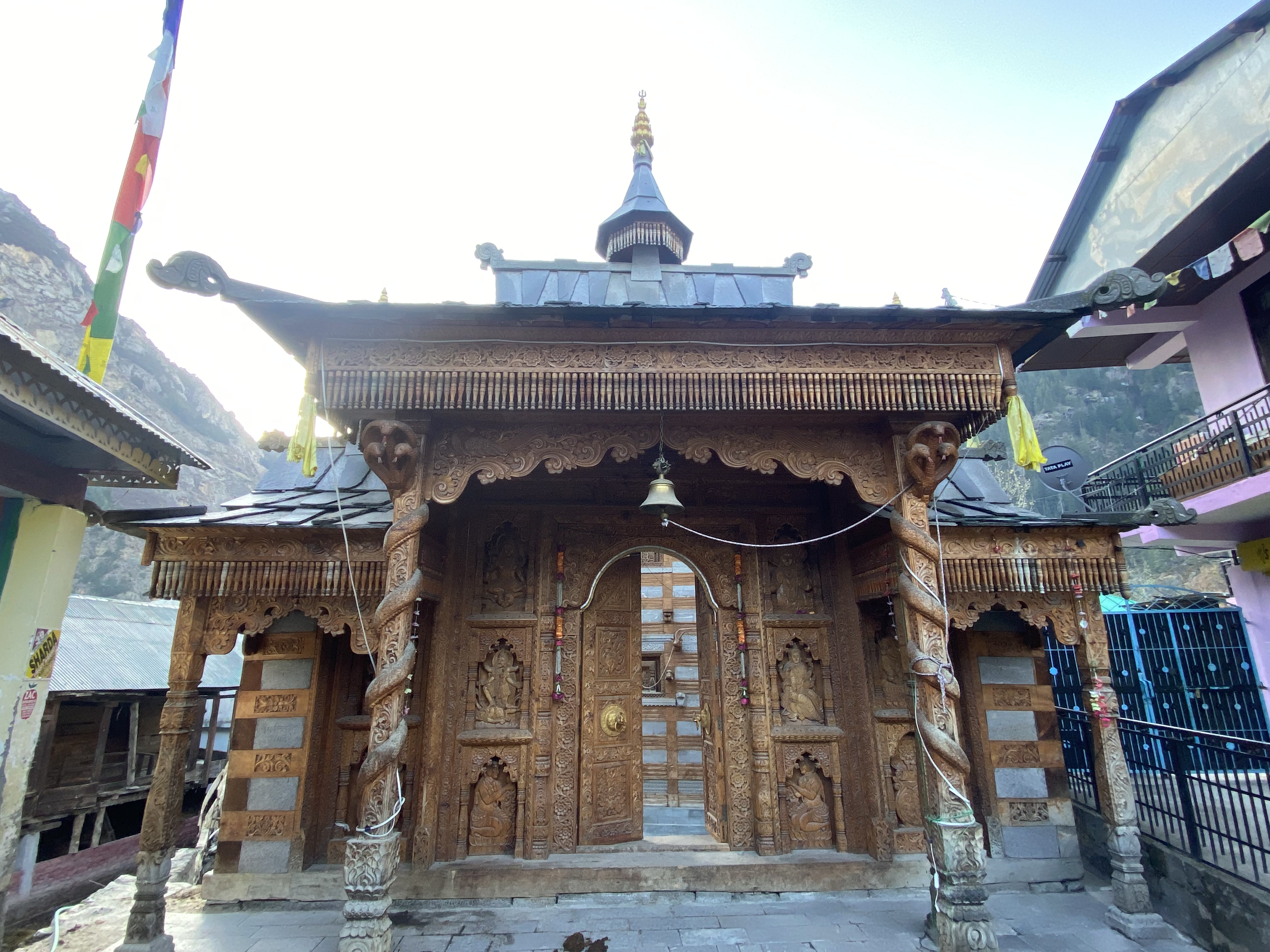
Batseri Badri Narayan Temple

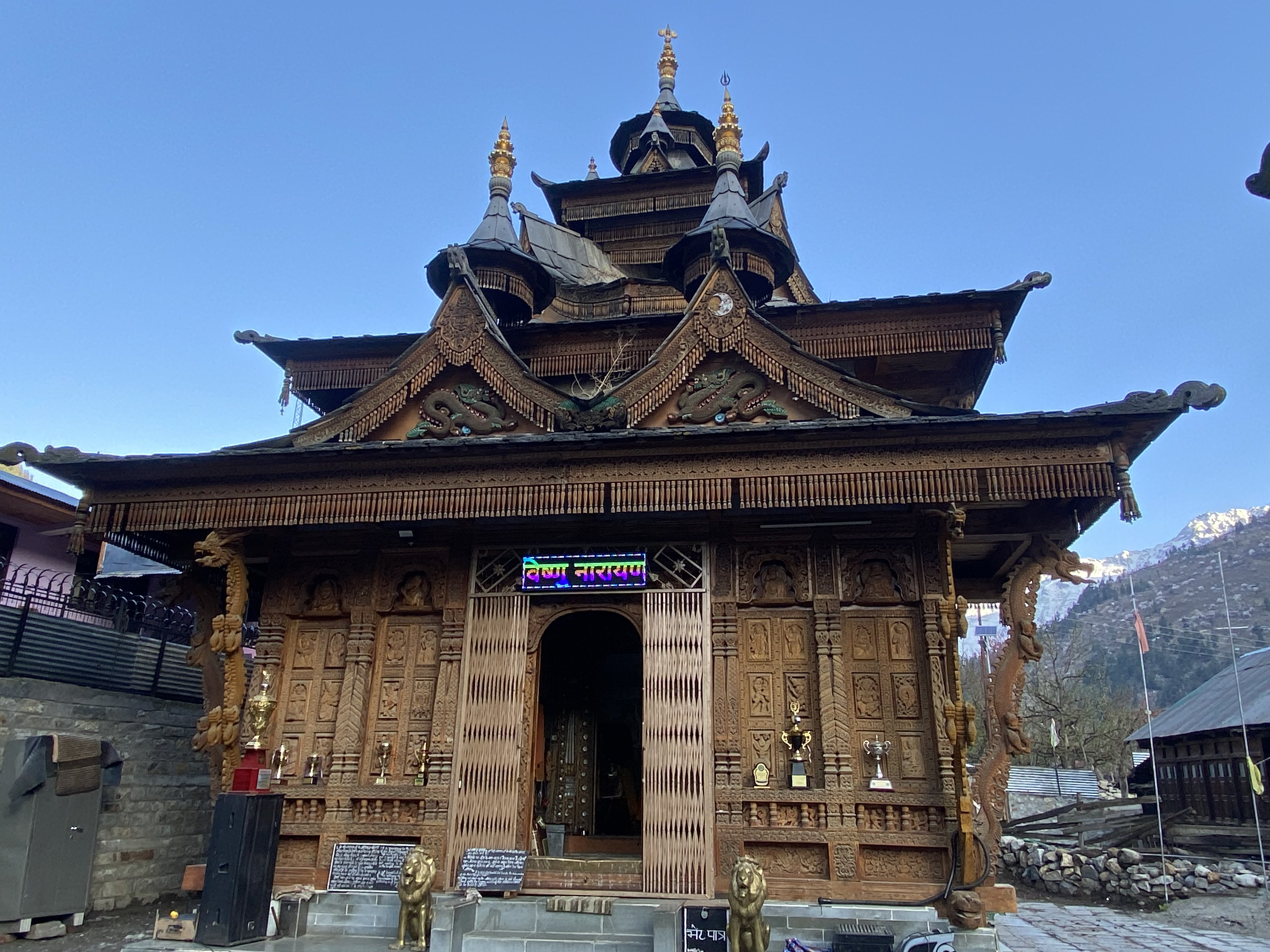
Batseri Badri Narayan Temple Mail Building

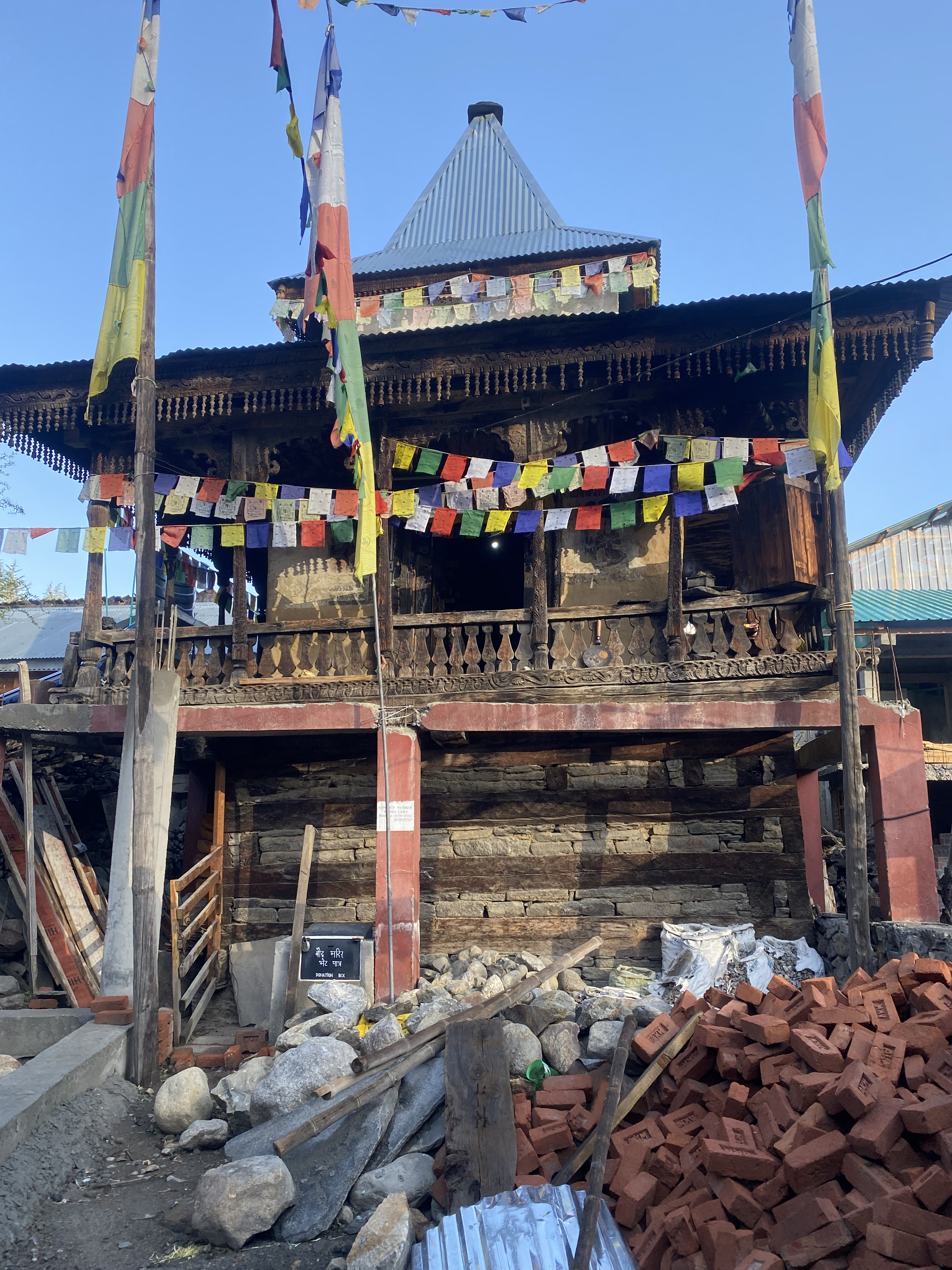
Batseri Buddhist Monastery

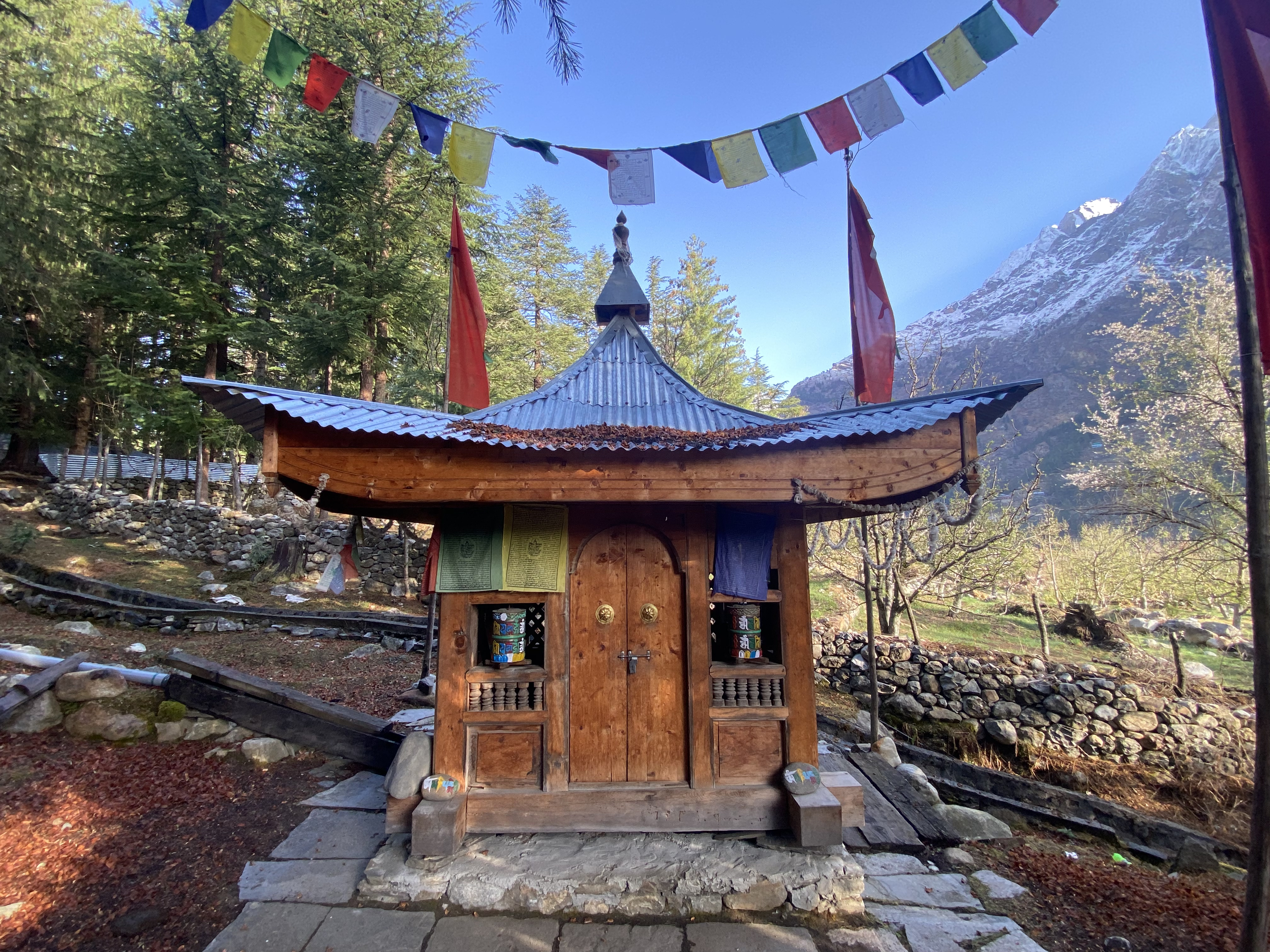
Batseri Buddhist Monastery Small

== See also ==
- Sangla Valley
