= Rakchham =

Rakchham राक्छम
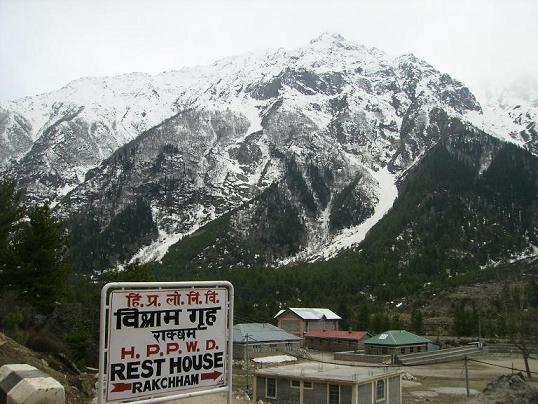
- Rakchham village

- Location in Himachal Pradesh
- Coordinates: 31.377°N 78.366°E
- Country: India
- State: Himachal Pradesh
- District: Kinnaur district

Population (2011)
  - Total: 597

Languages
  - Official: Hindi
  - Native: Chitkuli Kinnauri language
- Time zone: UTC+5:30 (IST)

Rakchham is a village in Sangla Valley in the Kinnaur district of Himachal Pradesh state of India.

== Administration ==
Rakchham is also the geostrategically important proposed HQ of the proposed Maathi-Baspa district near disputed Pulam Sumda on India-Tibet LAC.

== Transport ==
Rakchham is around 569 km from the National capital Delhi, 345 km from Chandigarh and 28 km from Sangla.

From Kharcham at NH5, follow the Baspa River Valley to reach Sangla, Rakchham and then Chitkul.

Karcham-Chitkul-Harshil Road, from Karcham NH-5 to Rakchham-Chitkul and then to Harshil (towards disputed Pulam Sumda on LAC, with a road tunnel under the Lamkhaga Pass, is under construction which will cut down present 450 km long distance, which take nearly 16 hours, to just nearly 150 km or 2 to 3 hours. In 2024, BRO began constructing 40-km long Kharcham-Sangla-Chitkul section of Karcham-Harshil Road. This road begins at NH5 (runs from Punjab, via Himachal, to Shipki La on India-Tibet Border).

== See also ==
- Baspa Valley
- Sangla Valley, part of Baspa Valley where Baspa River flows by Sangla village
- Chitkuli Kinnauri language
- Liar's Dice (film), story set around Chitkul
