= Sangla, India =

Town in Kinnaur district, Himachal Pradesh, India

Sangla
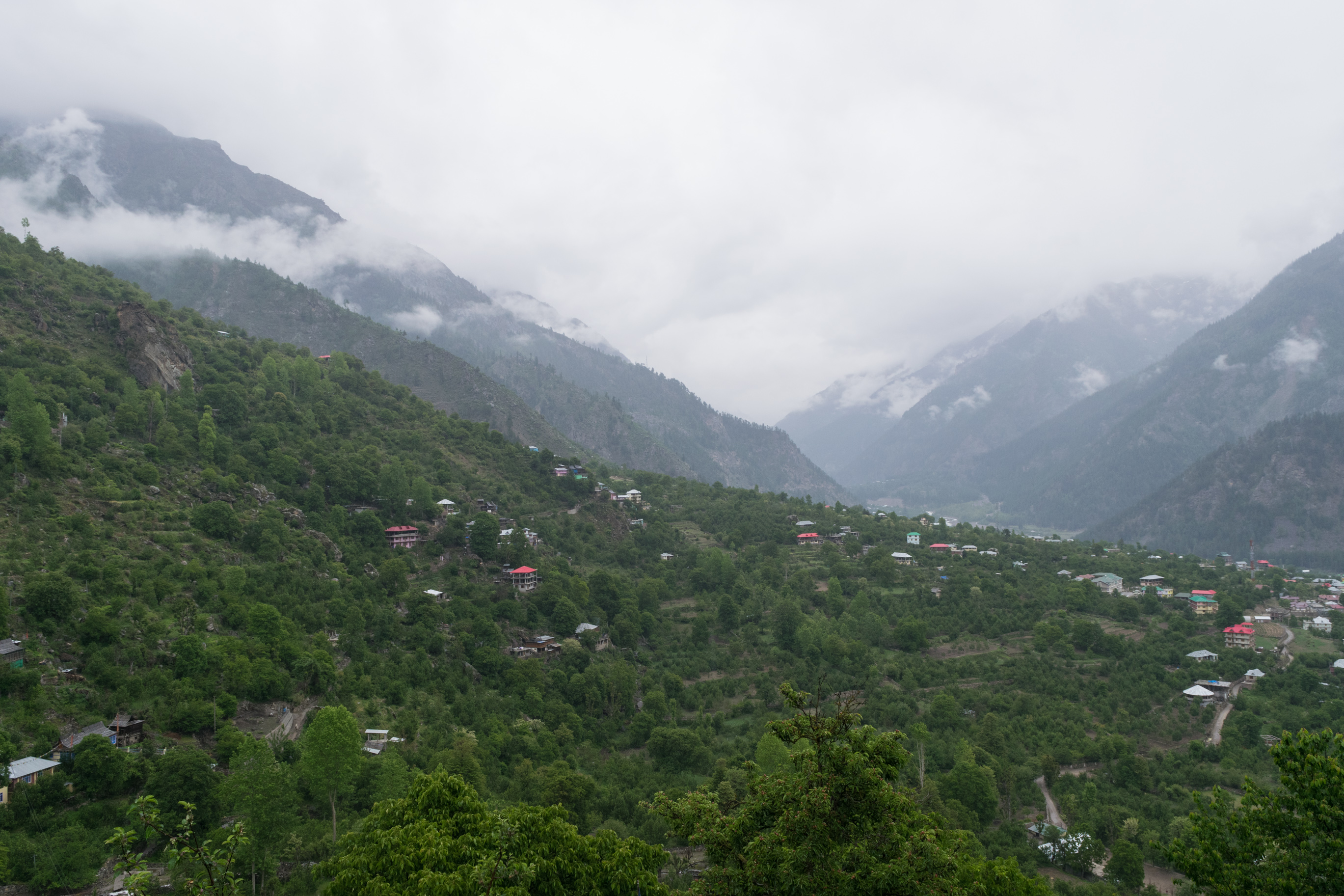
- View of Sangla from Kamru

- Location in Himachal Pradesh
- Coordinates: 31°25′35″N 78°15′54″E
- Country: India
- State: Himachal Pradesh
- District: Kinnaur

Government
  - Body: Gram Panchayat Sangla

Area
  - Total: 3.09 km^{2} (1.19 sq mi)
- Elevation: 2,650 m (8,690 ft)

Population (2011)
  - Total: 2,224
  - Density: 720/km^{2} (1,860/sq mi)

Languages
  - Official: Hindi
  - Native: Kinnauri; Chitkuli Kinnauri language
- Time zone: UTC+5:30 (IST)
- Postal code: 172106
- Lok Sabha constituency: Mandi
- Vidhan Sabha constituency: Kinnaur

Sangla is a town in the Baspa Valley, in the Kinnaur District of Himachal Pradesh, India, close to the border with Tibet. It is the administrative headquarter of the eponymous Sangla tehsil, and the primary town in the Baspa Valley which is also referred to as the Sangla Valley.

== Legend ==
According to a local legend related to the origin of the Baspa Valley, the region was earlier submerged below a lake and under the influence of Narayan. The Nag Devta, preceding deity of Sangla, came to the area from the south, across the Chanshal range, and contested with the Narayan for the right to remain in the region. The Narayan and the Nag took form of a cat and a rat, respectively, with the rat burrowing a hole draining the lake thus winning the right to remain in Sangla.

== Physiography ==
=== Geography ===
Sangla is located at an altitude of 2,650 metres (8,690 ft) above mean sea level on the right bank of the Baspa River. It is situated on the lower end of an alluvial fan of moderate slope in a bowl-shaped section of the Baspa Valley.

=== Climate ===
Sangla receives around 270.1 millimetres (10.63 in) of rainfall, and about 270 millimetres (11 in) of snowfall. In the winters, the temperature can drop as low as -15°C.

== Economy ==
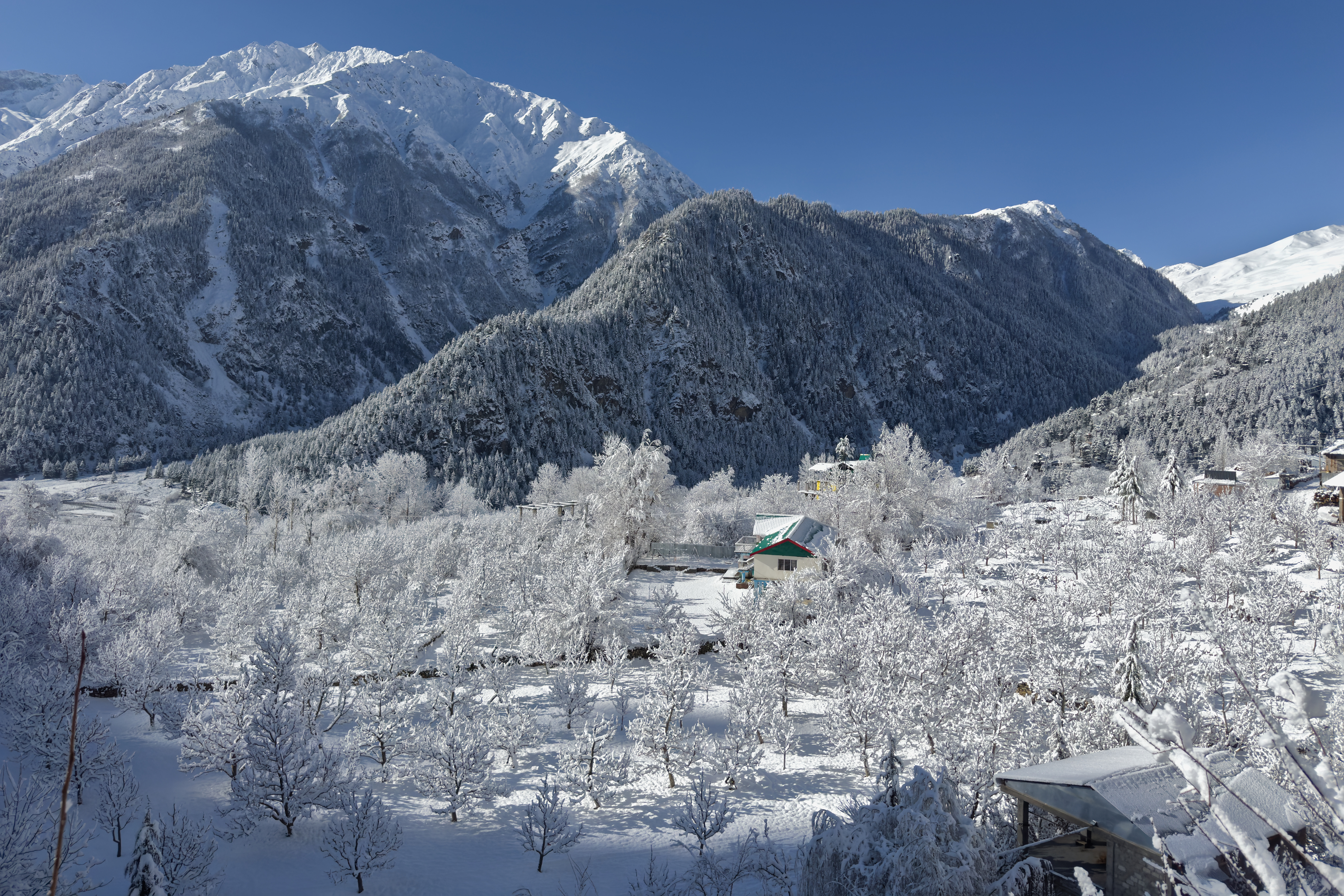
Apple orchards under snow in Sangla

Agriculture and tourism are the primary economic activities of the region. Apples constitute an important cash crop and are widely cultivated. A trout farm was established at Sangla in 1961–1962 by the state fisheries department on the banks of the Baspa river. A goat breeding farm was also opened in 1960 to breed chigu goats for their pashm wool, but following the closure of the Indo-Tibetan border after the 1962 India-China war, it was closed down.

== Demographics ==
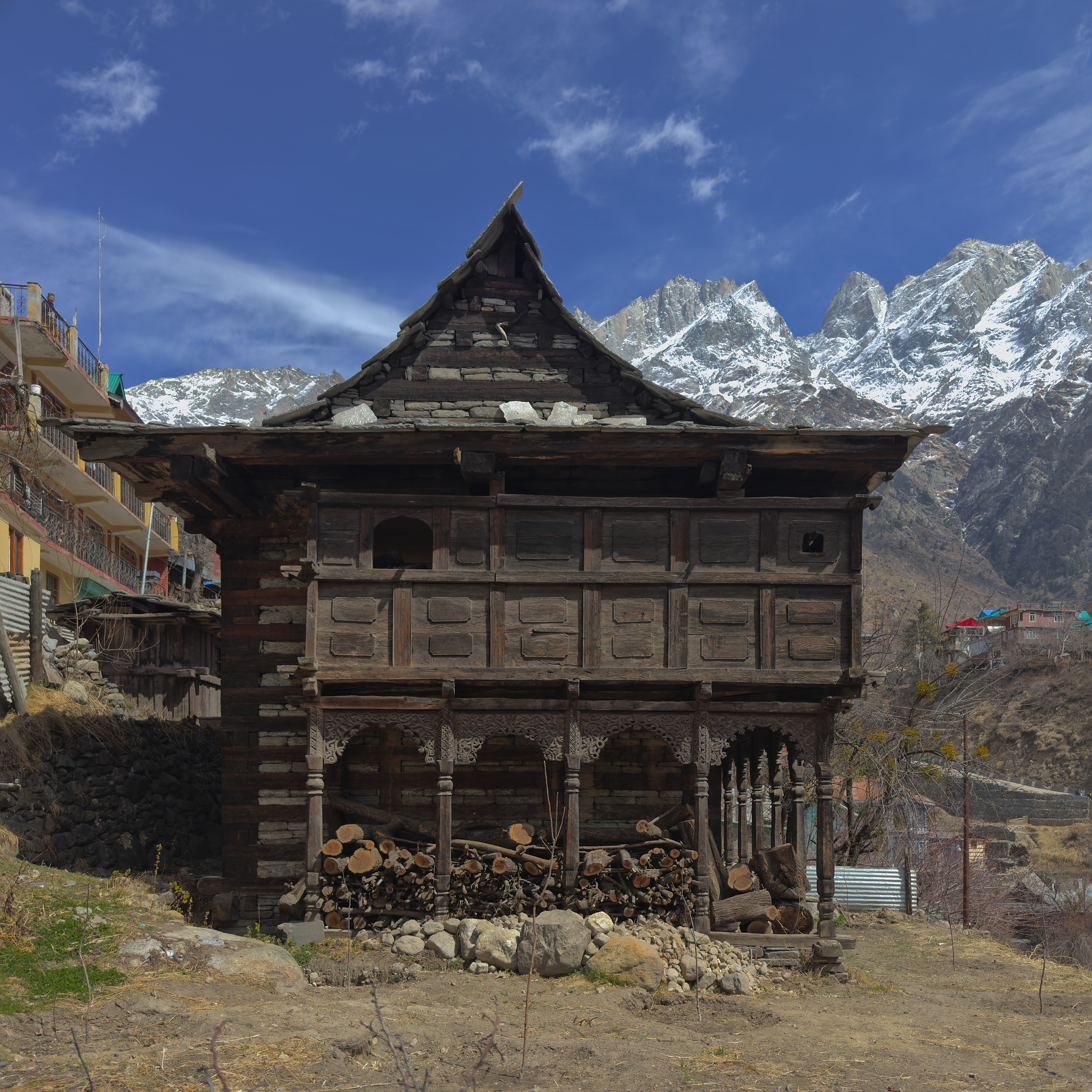
A traditional Kinnauri house built in the vernacular style in Sangla

According to the 2011 census, the population of Sangla was 2,224, with 1,125 males and 1,119 females giving it a sex ratio of 995. Around 219 were under the age of 6 years old, corresponding to about 10% of the population. About 62% of the population was scheduled tribes (ST), and around 24% was scheduled caste (SC). About 71% of the population was literate.

The local people have a distinct culture and their own dialect, the Kinnauri language.

== Education ==
Around 71% of the population of Sangla (1,594 people) was literate according to the 2011 census. Sangla had one pre-primary school, three primary schools, one middle school, one secondary school and one senior secondary school in 2011. There were no institutions of higher education in the village.

== Tourism ==
=== Trekking routes ===
- Rupin Valley Trek
- Sangla Kande Trek
- Charang Chitkul Trek

=== Places of interest ===
Being located at center of the Baspa River valley, Sangla is the locus of exploration and trekking trails. Other touristy habitations nearby, upstream of the Baspa River valley, are Rakchham and Chitkul.

- Kamru Fort
- Lake and Dam, Kupa
- Trout Farm
- The Mall (Sangla)
- Riverside in Chitkul
- village walks in Kupa, Kamru, Sangla and Batseri villages.

=== Temples ===
- Badrinath Temple, Kamru
- Bering Nag Temple, Sangla
- Batseri
- Mata Devi Temple Chhitkul
- Piri Nages Temple, Sapni

=== Festivals ===
- Saazo - January
- Faagul/ Holi - March
- Dakhrain - July
- Ukhyang - September

== Transport ==
Sangla lies on the 40-km long Kharcham-Sangla-Rakchham-Chitkul section of under construction 150 km long Karcham-Harshil Road, later of which begins from Karcham NH-5 will have a road tunnel under the Lamkhaga Pass.

== Gallery ==
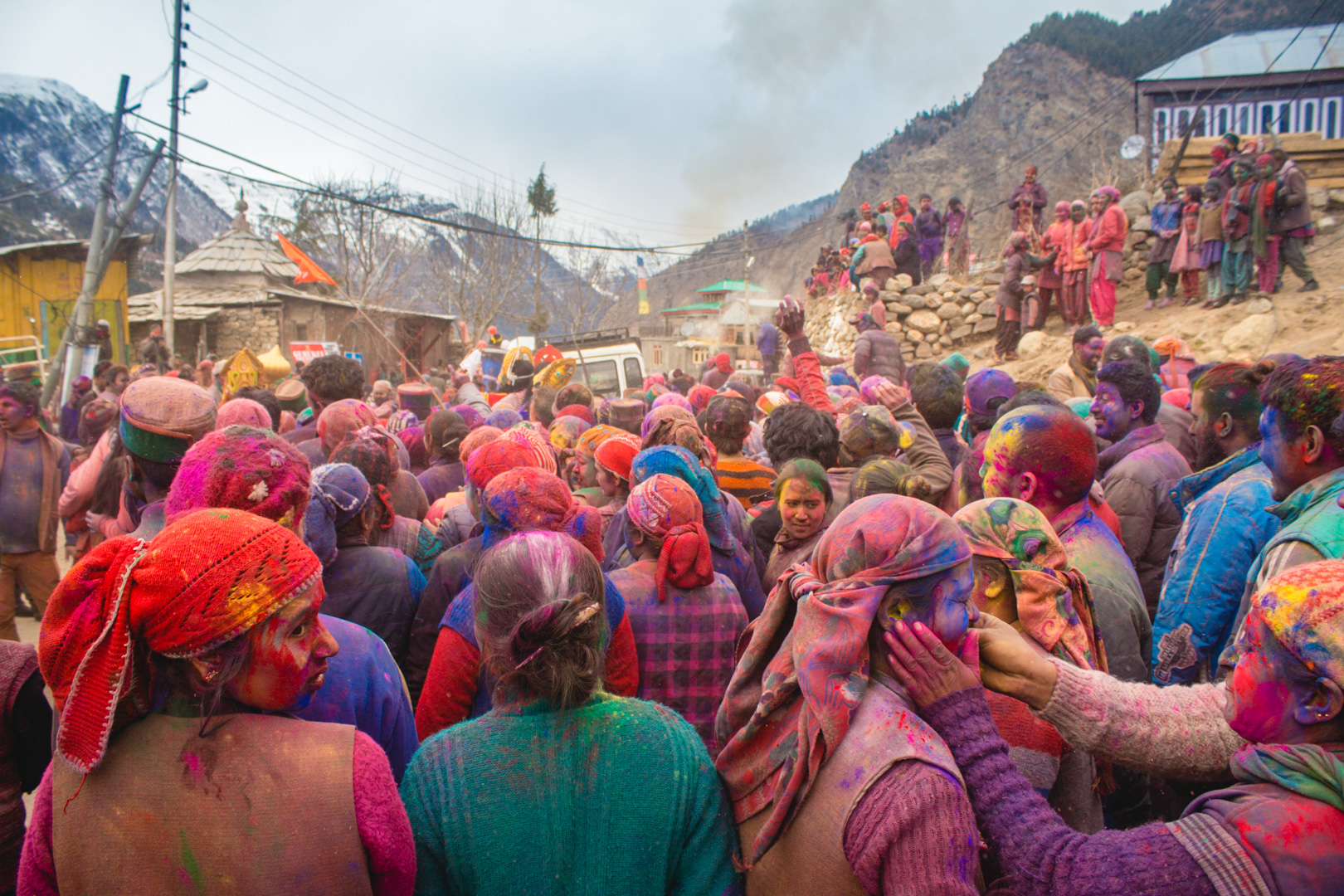
Local women celebrating Holi in Sangla

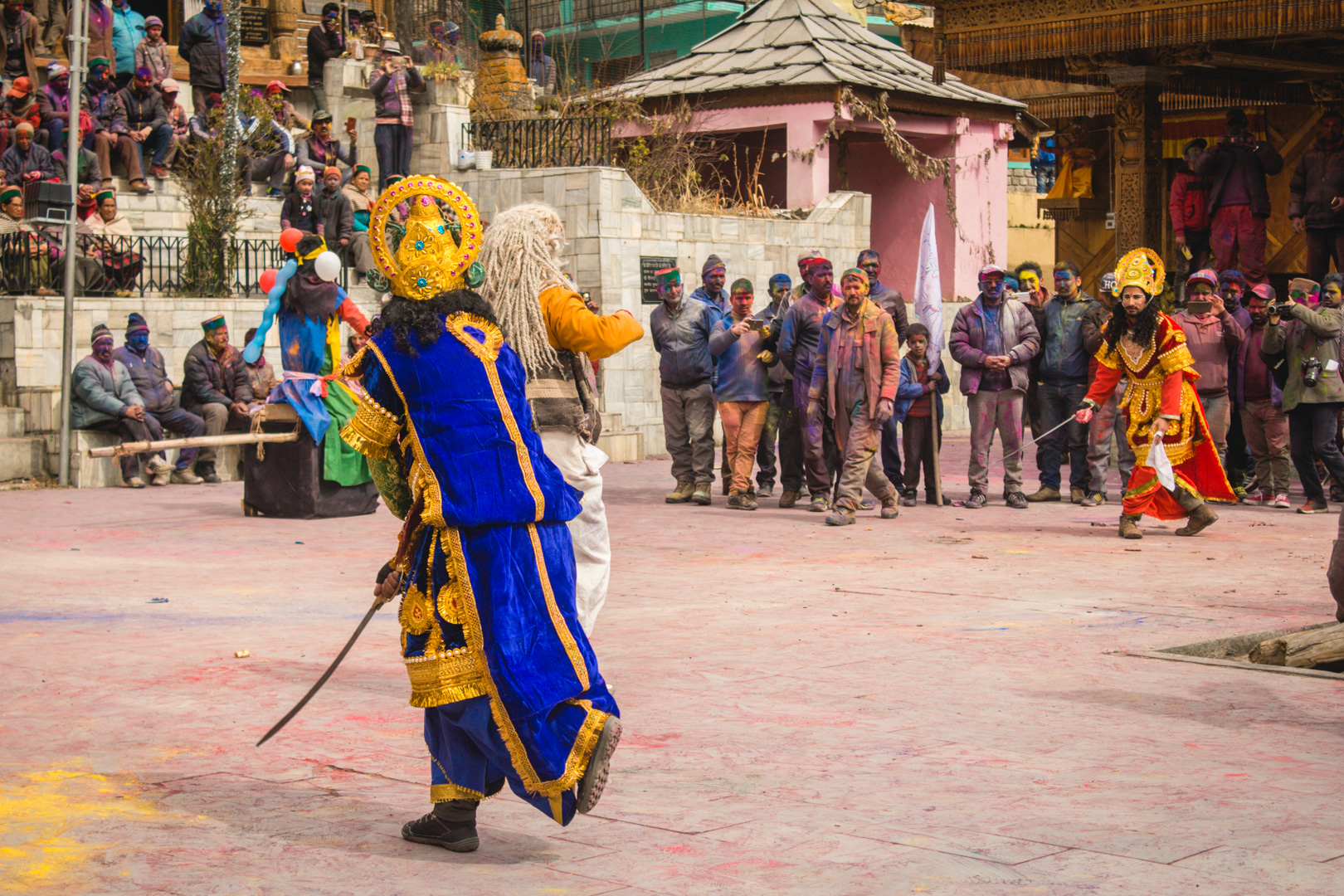
A traditional skit during a festival in Sangla

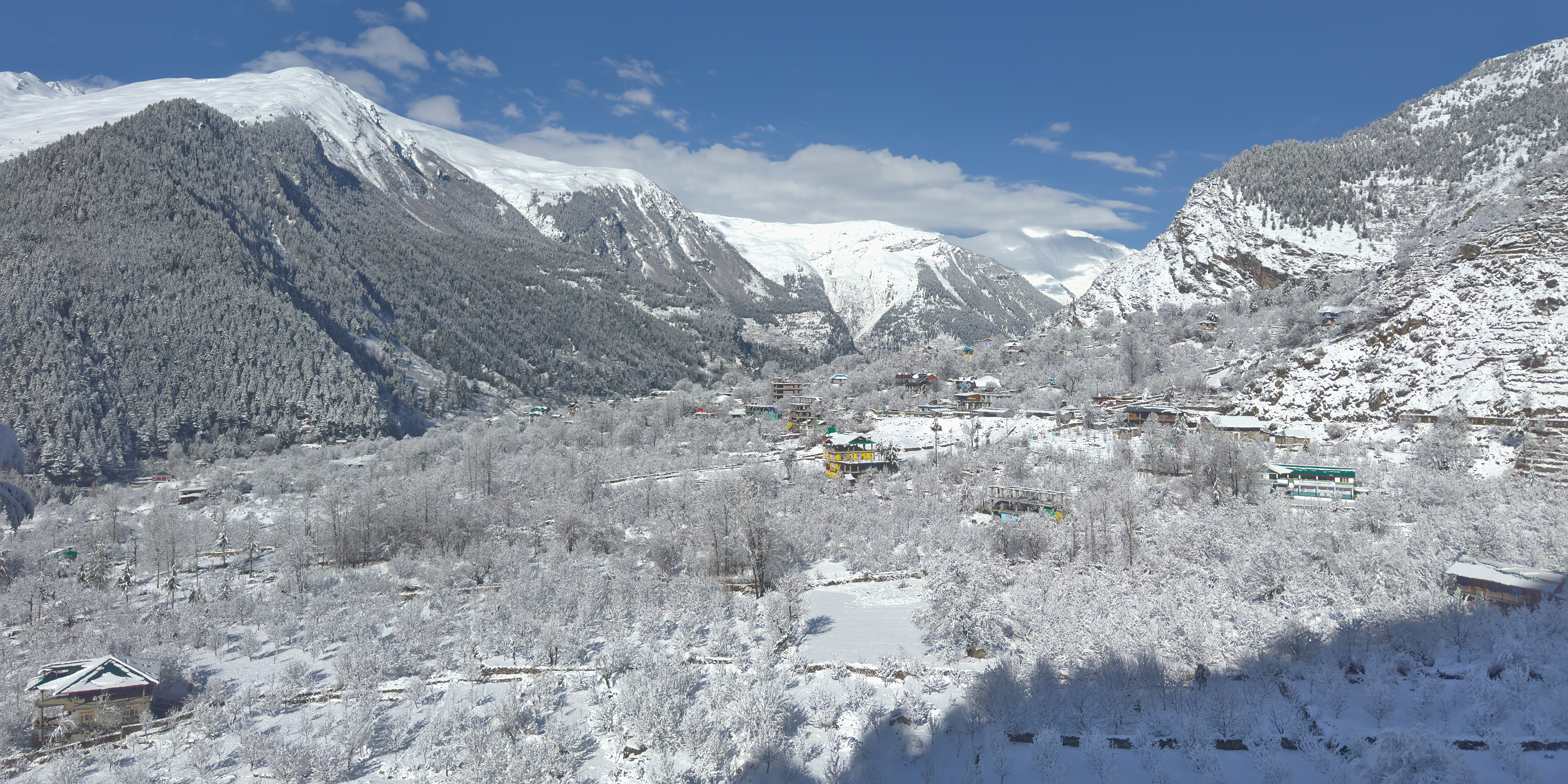
View of Sangla from the east after snowfall

== See also ==
- Baspa Valley
- Sangla Valley
- Chitkuli Kinnauri language
- Liar's Dice (film), story set around Chitkul

== Bibliography ==
- Bajpai, Shiva Chandra (1981), Kinnaur in the Himalaya: Mythology to Modernity, Concept Publishing Company, ISBN 81-7022-180-3
- Raha, Manis Kumar; Mahato, Sankar Narayan (1985), The Kinnaurese of the Himalaya, Anthropological Survey of India
- Sanan, Deepak; Swadi, Dhanu (1998), Exploring Kinnaur and Spiti in the trans-Himalaya, Indus Publishing Company, ISBN 81-7387-074-8
- Verma, Shiva Chandra (2002), Kanauras of Kinnaur: A scheduled tribe in Himachal Pradesh, B.R. Publishers
