= Karcham Wangtoo Hydroelectric Plant =

Karcham Wangtoo Dam
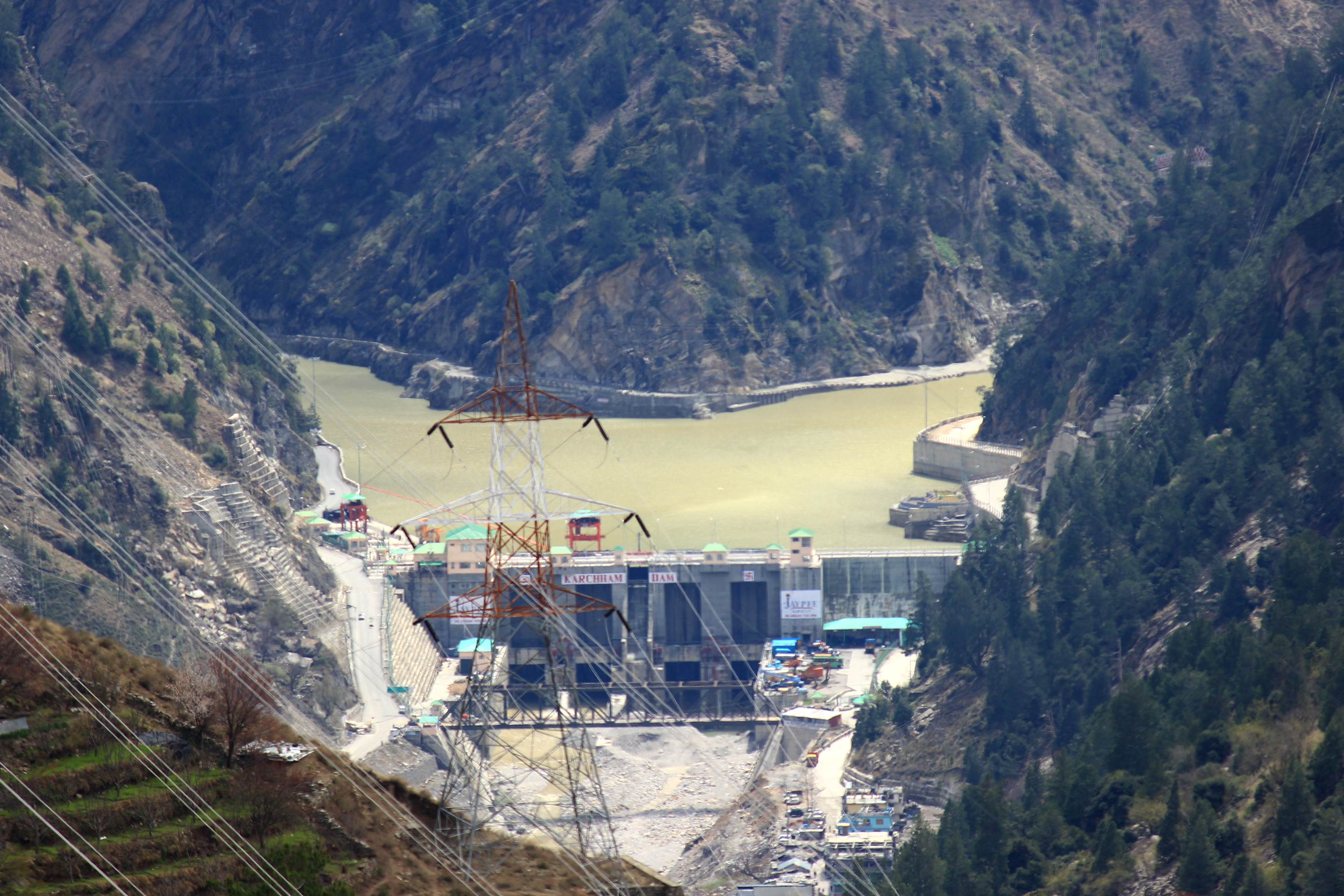

- Location within India Location within Himachal Pradesh
- Official name: Karcham Wangtoo Hydroelectric Plant
- Coordinates: 31°32′35.53″N 78°00′54.80″E
- Purpose: Power
- Status: Operational
- Construction began: 2005
- Opening date: 2011
- Construction cost: Rs. 7,150 crore ($687 million USD 2011)
- Owner: JSW Group

Dam and spillways
- Type of dam: Gravity dam
- Impounds: Sutlej River
- Height: 98 m (322 ft)
- Length: 177.8 m (583 ft)
- Elevation at crest: 1,813 m (5,948 ft)

Reservoir
- Surface area: 588 m^{2} (0 acres)
- Normal elevation: 1,810 m (5,938 ft)

Power Station
- Commission date: 2011
- Hydraulic head: 298 m (978 ft) (gross)
- Turbines: 4 x 250 MW Francis-type
- Installed capacity: 1,000 MW
- Annual generation: 4,560 GWh est.

The Karcham Wangtoo Hydroelectric Plant is a 1,091 megawatts (1,463,000 hp) run-of-the-river hydroelectric power station on the Sutlej River in Kinnaur district of Himachal Pradesh state of India.

== Etymology ==
The dam and power station are located between the villages of Karcham and Wangtoo where the plant also gains its name.

== History ==
In 1993, and after years of delays, the Jaypee Karcham Hydro Corporation Limited of Jaypee Group signed a memorandum of understanding to develop the dam. On 18 November 2005, the construction on the power station began. In 2015, Jaypee Group sold out Karcham Wangtoo Project to JSW Group.

In May 2011, the first generator was commissioned, the second in June and the final two in September.

== Technical details ==
The 98 m (322 ft) tall dam at Karcham (31°30′00.26″N 78°10′39.54″E) diverts a substantial portion of the Sutlej into a 10.48 m (34.4 ft) diameter and 17.2 km (10.7 mi) long headrace tunnel to the underground power station downstream at Wangtoo. At the station, the water powers four 250 MW Francis turbine-generators before it is sent back into the Sutlej via a 1.2 km (0.75 mi) long tailrace tunnel. The difference in elevation between the dam and the power station affords a gross hydraulic head of 298 m (978 ft). Water not diverted by the dam is sent over the spillway and down the normal course of the river. The main spillway is along the crest of the dam and is controlled by six radial gates.

Just upstream of the dam is the 300 MW Baspa II Hydroelectric Plant and downstream of the Karcham Wangtoo is the 1,500 MW Nathpa Jhakri Dam.

== Transport ==
Karcham-Harshil Road, from Karcham NH-5 to Harshil, with a road tunnel under the Lamkhaga Pass, is under construction which will cut down present 450 km long distance, which take nearly 16 hours, to just nearly 150 km or 2 to 3 hours. In 2024, BRO began constructing 40-km long Kharcham-Sangla-Rakchham-Chitkul section of Karcham-Harshil Road.

== See also ==
- Nathpa Jhakri Dam – situated downstream
- Indus Water Treaty - includes Sutlej river
