= Mukhba =

Village in Harsil, Uttarakhand, India

Mukhba is a small village near the Gangotri Temple in Harsil, Uttarakhand, India, that hosts the idol of Goddess Ganga during winters, after it is brought down in a ritual ceremony from the temple, some nine miles away, as it becomes inaccessible after being snowed in. The priests of the Gangotri Temple hail from this village. The idol is brought down during the festival of Diwali (usually in October) with great celebration, and returns to the temple in spring (in April).
