= Defence Institute of Bio-Energy Research =

Indian defence laboratory

- Established: 1990
- Director: Devakanta Pahad Singh
- Location: Haldwani, Uttarakhand, India
- Operating agency: DRDO
- Website: www.drdo.gov.in/labs-and-establishments/defence-institute-bio-energy-research-diber

The Defence Institute of Bio-Energy Research (DIBER) is an Indian defence laboratory of the Defence Research and Development Organisation (DRDO), located in Haldwani in Uttarakhand state. It conducts research and development of bioenergy as well as the sustainable and eco-friendly high altitude agro-technologies in the Indian Himalayan Region for the use of Indian Military. It has developed a range of vegetable varieties suitable for mid to high altitude.

The present Director of DIBER is Devakanta Pahad Singh.

== History ==
DIBER has its origin as an "Agriculture Research Unit" (ARU) established by M.C. Joshi who was also its first director in 1967 at Sitoli, Almora which was renamed to Pithoragarh-headquartered "Defence Agricultural Research Laboratory" (DARL) in 1984 and to DIBER in 2008.

In 2020, with an intent to make the DRDO leaner and more effective, it was proposed to merge the "Defence Institute of Bio-Energy Research" (DIBER) with Defence Institute of High Altitude Research (DIHAR). The Institute has given its Self Autonomous Status with all its assets and locations. The collaboration with the Defence Food Research Laboratory and the Central Food Technological Research Institute of the Council of Scientific and Industrial Research (CSIR) will be enhanced.

== Field stations ==
DIBER, which has field stations at Harsil and Auli, has expanded its network of field stations to various agro-climatic zones of India. DIBER's field station in Pithrogarh, Uttarakhand, is undertaking research, along with eight other defence research laboratories, on various microalgae systems to extract biofuels which can be used in the Indian Army's vehicles.

== Achievements ==
In 2020, Dr. Hemant Kumar Pandey, PhD, was awarded DRDO's "Scientist of the Year Award" by Defence Minister Rajnath Singh for his contribution in developing several herbal medicines, including the Lukoskin drug, a herbal concoction of 8 herbs found in Himalayan region, for treating leucoderma.
