= Chanshal Pass =

Mountain pass in India

Chanshal Pass / Chanshal Valley
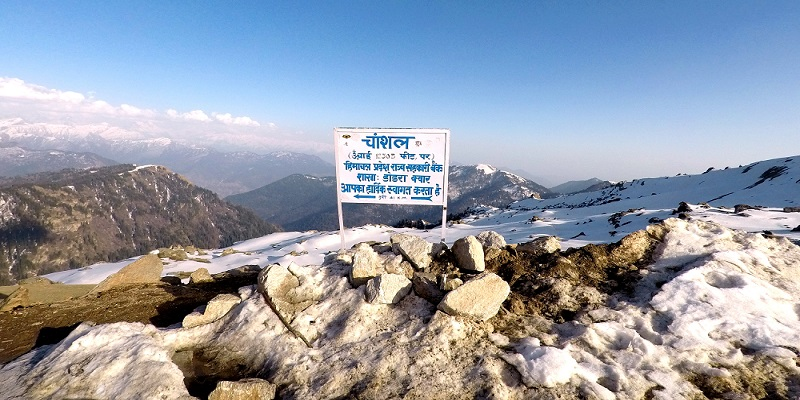
- Chanshal Pass
- Interactive map of Chanshal Pass / Chanshal Valley
- Elevation: 3,749 metres (12,300 ft)
- Traversed by: Seasonal Road between Chirgaon (Rohru) and Dodra-Kwar

Third Approach
- Location: India
- Range: Himalayas
- Coordinates: 31.1971°N 77.9887°E

The Chanshal Pass, or Chanshal Valley, links Dodra Kwar and Rohru (Chirgaon) in the Shimla district of the Indian state of Himachal Pradesh. The pass sits atop Chanshal Peak, which at 4,520 metres (14,830 ft) is the highest peak in the Shimla district. The pass remains open from May to november and is covered with snow for the rest of the year.

== Location ==
The Chanshal Pass is a 180 kilometres (110 mi) road from Shimla, accessible from May to november. Chanshal is a mountain range that cuts the Dodra Kawar Valley from the Rohru area. Its peaks reach 17,000 feet (5,200 m) and can be accessed from Chanshal Pass.

== Accessibility ==
Chanshal Pass, also known as Chanshal Valley, affords views of the Himalayas. As of June 2012, a single bus operated between Rohru and Dodra Kwar. Two routes connect Shimla to Chanshal Valley:

- Shimla-Theog-Kotkhai-Kharapathar-Hatkoti-Rohru-Larot-Valley, 160 km (99 mi)
- Shimla-Theog-Narkanda-Sungri-Rohru-Larot-Valley, 175 km (109 mi)

== Geography ==
The Chanshal Valley affords views of hills covered with ice. Trekking to the top of hills is fairly strenuous. Saru tal (lake) is located on the top of one of the hills resembling a Thalli.
