= Chitkul =

Village in Kinnaur district, Himachal Pradesh, India

- village
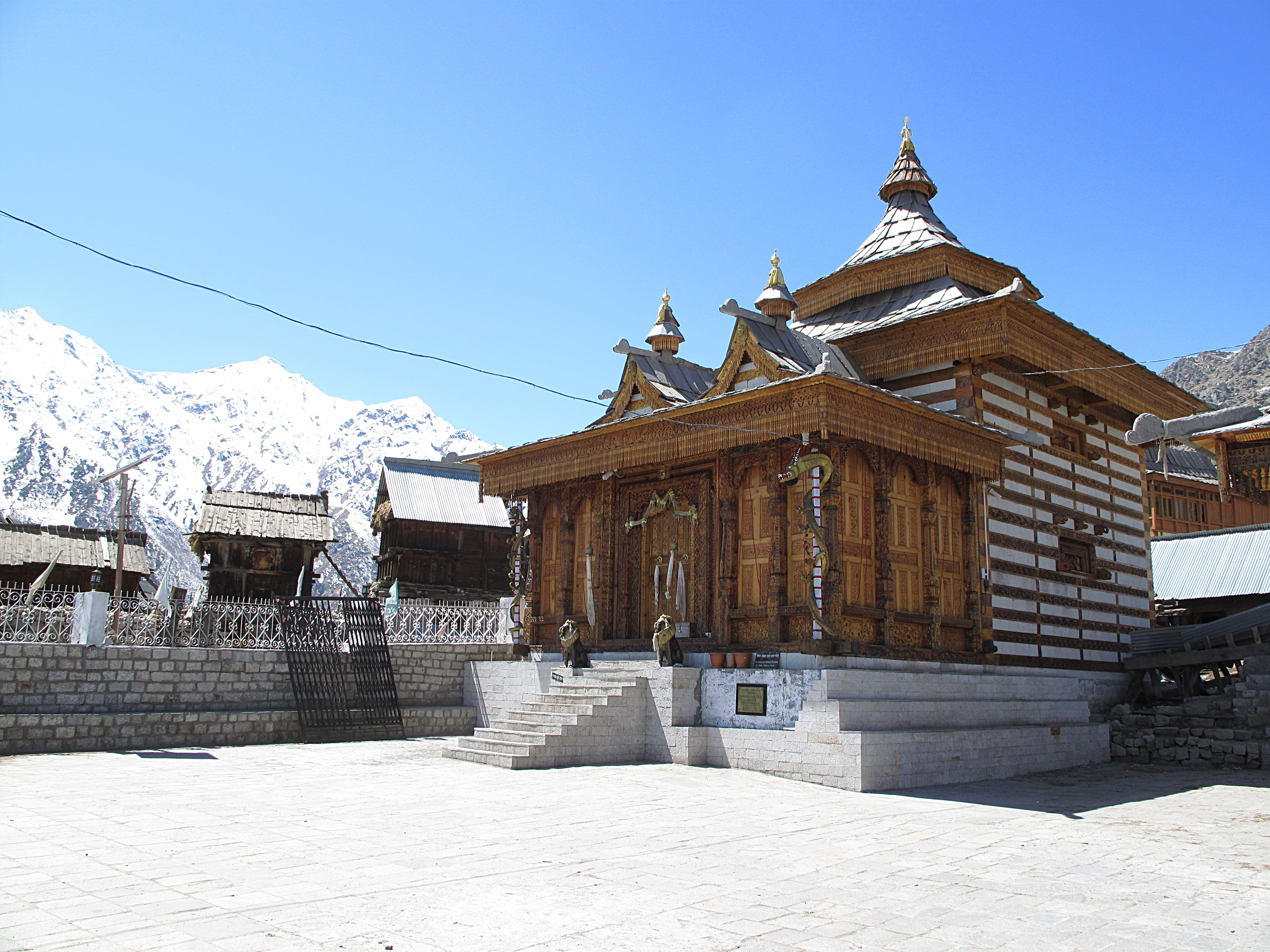
- Mathi temple at Chitkul, the locals say it could be 500 years old.

- Location in Himachal Pradesh, India Chitkul (India)
- Coordinates: 31.3518411°N 78.4368253°E
- Country: India
- State: Himachal Pradesh
- District: Kinnaur
- Elevation: 3,450 m (11,320 ft)

Population (2010)
  - Total: 882

Languages
  - Official: Hindi
  - Native: Chitkuli Kinnauri language
- Time zone: UTC+5:30 (IST)
- PIN: 172106
- Vehicle registration: HP-
- Nearest city: Rampur
- Climate: Alpine climate (Köppen)

Chitkul is a village in Kinnaur district of Himachal Pradesh. During winters, the place mostly remains covered with snow and the inhabitants move to lower regions of Himachal.

According to a recent study by Centre of Atmospheric Sciences at IIT Delhi, Chitkul has the cleanest air in India.

== Geography ==
Chitkul, a village located on right bank of Baspa River, is the last village of the Baspa Valley and the last village on the old Hindustan-Tibet trade route. It is also the last point in India one can travel to without a permit. From Kharcham at NH5, follow the Baspa River Valley to reach Sangla, Rakchham and then Chitkul.

== Tourism ==
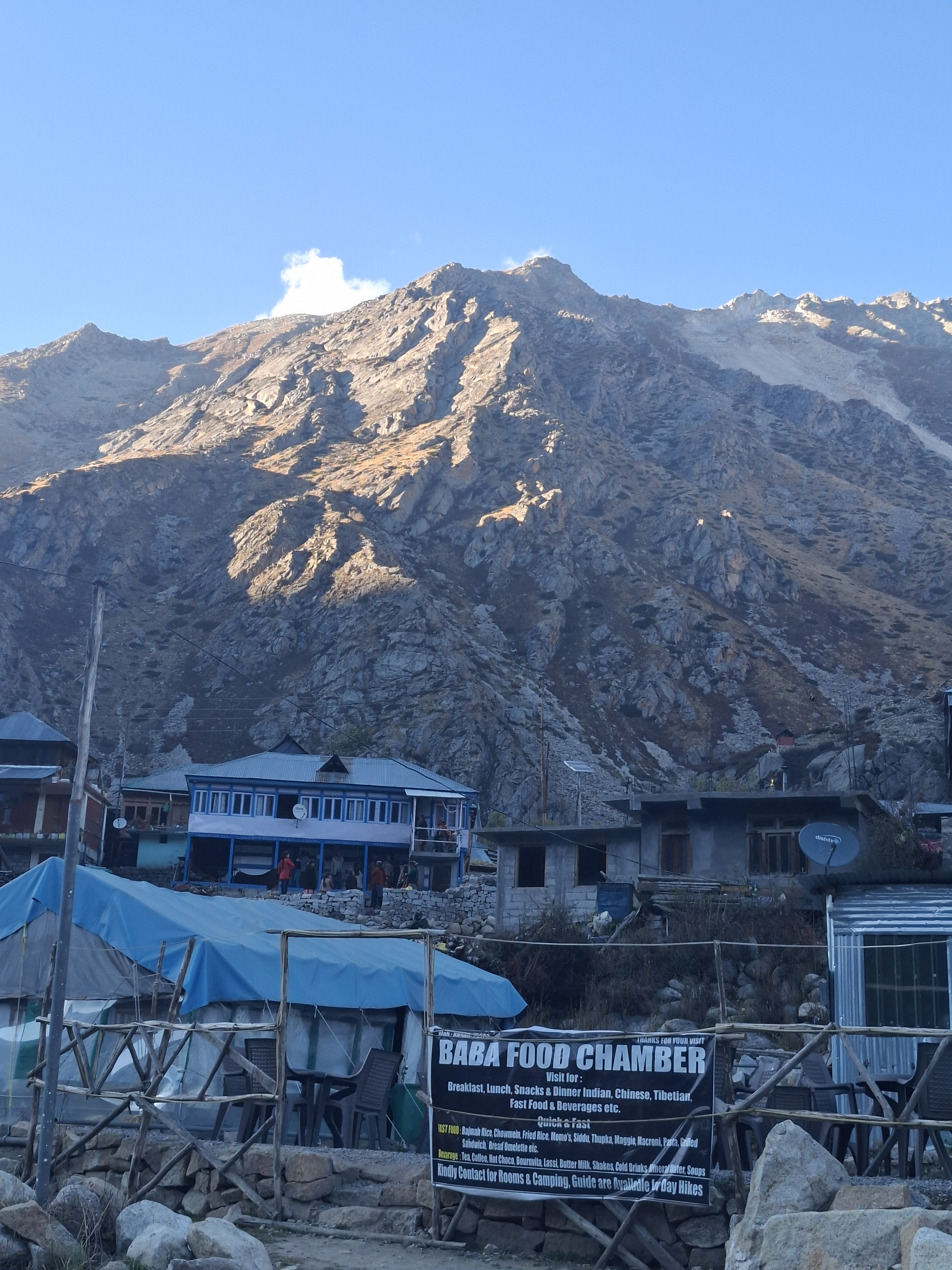
Chitkul Village in Baspa valley.

=== Kath Kuni architecture ===
Kath Kuni architecture (wood and stone architecture): Of particular interest at Chitkul are its houses with either slate or wooden plank roofs, a Buddhist temple and a small tower. However, there has been an increased use of tin-roofs, especially the high school and the army/ITBP barracks.

=== Trekking and mountain passes ===
- Charang Pass (5,242m) north-northwest of Chitkul: Connects the Baspa Valley to the Tidong Valley to the north.
- Lamkhaga Pass (5,282m) southeast of Chitkul: Leads from the head of the Baspa Valley (beyond Chitkul) over to the Harsil/Gangotri region of Uttarakhand. Chitkul is start point for Lamkhaga Pass trek and Borasu pass treks. Nagasthi ITBP post is 4 km and Ranikanda meadows is 10 km trek from Chitkul.
- Borasu Pass (5,450m) southeast of Chitkul further than Lamkhaga Pass: Another high-altitude trek that connects the Baspa Valley to the Tons Valley (Har Ki Dun) in Uttarakhand.
- Rupin Pass (4,650m, also called Sarasvotri for origin of Sarasvati River at Sarasvati Glacier) southwest of Chitkul: Connects the Dhaula region of Uttarakhand to the Sangla side of the valley.

- Buran Ghati Pass (4,572m) west-southwest of Chitkul: Connects the Pabbar Valley (Shimla district) to the Sangla Valley.

=== Religious tourism ===
- Mathi Mata Temple (also called Chitkul Mata) in Chitkul is a masterpiece of Kath Kuni architecture, characterized by alternating layers of stone and deodar wood that have stood for approximately 500 years. According to local folklore, the goddess Mathi Devi (Parvati), consort of the Lord Badrinath (Shiva), traveled from Vrindavan, crossing the high Himalayan passes to eventually reach the Baspa Valley. Legend holds that she strategically appointed her family members as guardians over the seven divisions of the valley, including her nephew Narenas at Chasu and Shamshares at Rakchham, before choosing Chitkul as her final abode. Local oral tradition credits her arrival with bringing unprecedented prosperity, transforming the village into a fertile land protected from natural calamities. After one crosses over the 5,242 m high Charang Pass, it is a long and steep run down through slithery scree slopes to Chitkul(3,450m). The powerful goddess of Chitkul is the only non-Buddhist deity to which respect must be paid by the Parikrama pilgrims. It is believed that the local Deity is related to the Deity of Gangotri and till recently the locals would carry the Deity to Gangotri on foot over high mountain passes. Chitkul is situated around 40 km from Karcham, the place where road bifurcates from Hindustan-Tibet Road (NH 22). The Sangla Valley is a delight for nature lovers; especially the stretch after Raksham and right up to Chitkul. The valley is extremely beautiful, on the left bank of the Baspa River are snow-clad mountains and on the right bank the whole terrain is full of apple orchards and wooden houses.

- Kagyupa Tibetan Buddhist temple has a highly valued old image of the Shakyamuni Buddha, a Wheel of Life mandala and four Directional Kings on either side of the door. Chitkul is practically the last point of the famous Kinner Kailash Parikrama as one can hitch a hike from here onwards.

== Transport ==
Chitkul is around 569 km from the National capital Delhi, 345 km from Chandigarh and 28 km from Sangla.

Karcham-Chitkul-Harshil Road, from Karcham NH-5 to Chitkul and then to Harshil (towards disputed Pulam Sumda on LAC, with a road tunnel under the Lamkhaga Pass, is under construction which will cut down present 450 km long distance, which take nearly 16 hours, to just nearly 150 km or 2 to 3 hours. In 2024, BRO began constructing 40-km long Kharcham-Sangla-Chitkul section of Karcham-Harshil Road. This road begins at NH5 (runs from Punjab, via Himachal, to Shipki La on India-Tibet Border).

== Gallery ==
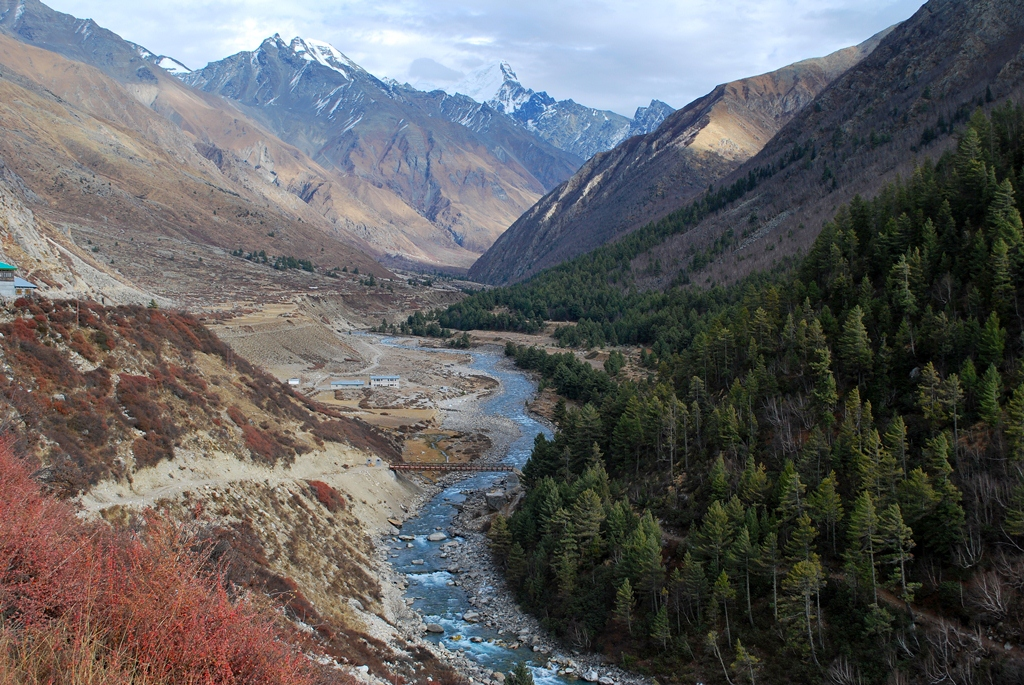
Baspa River flowing next to Chitkul

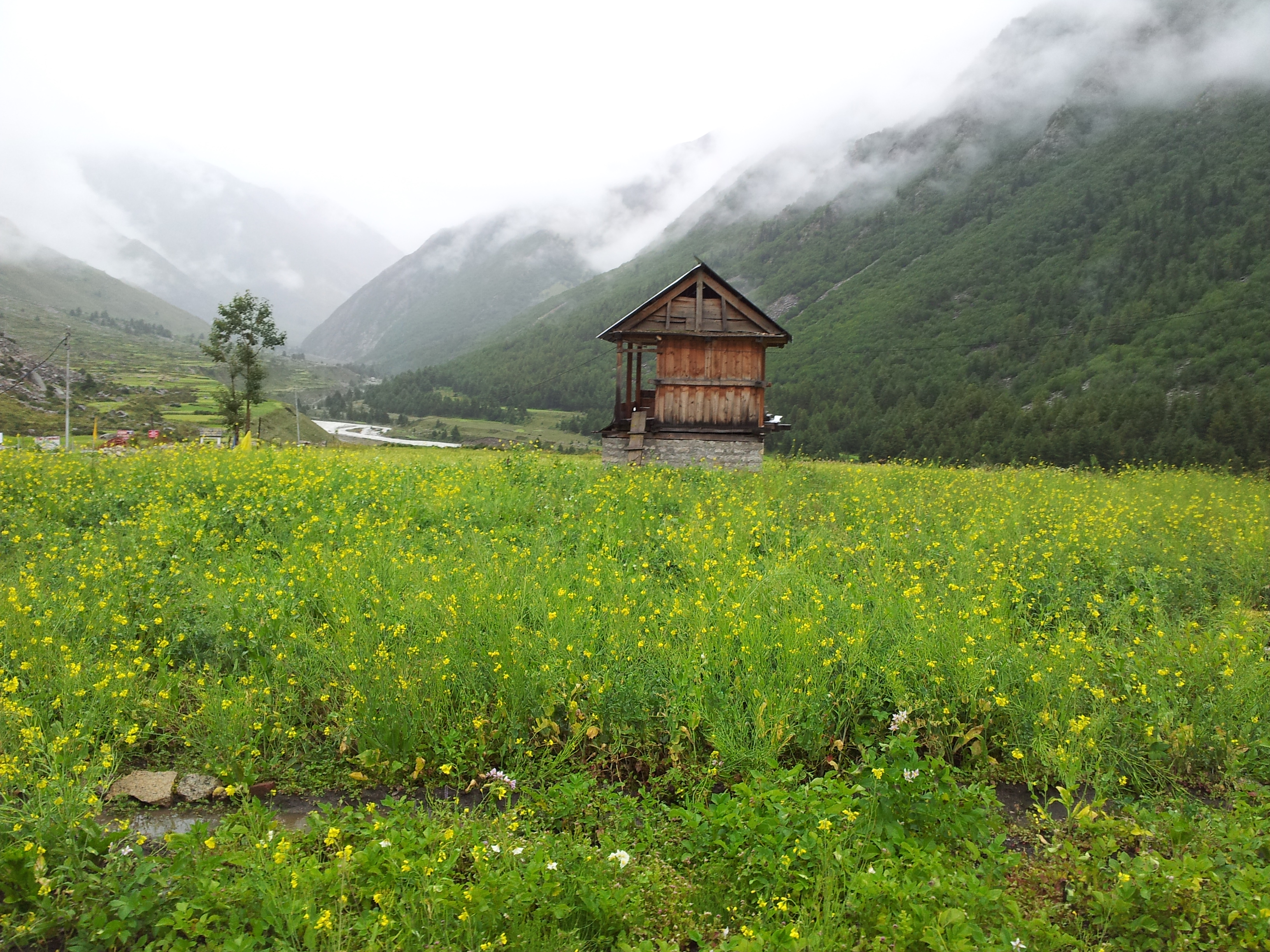
Wooden hut in Chitkul

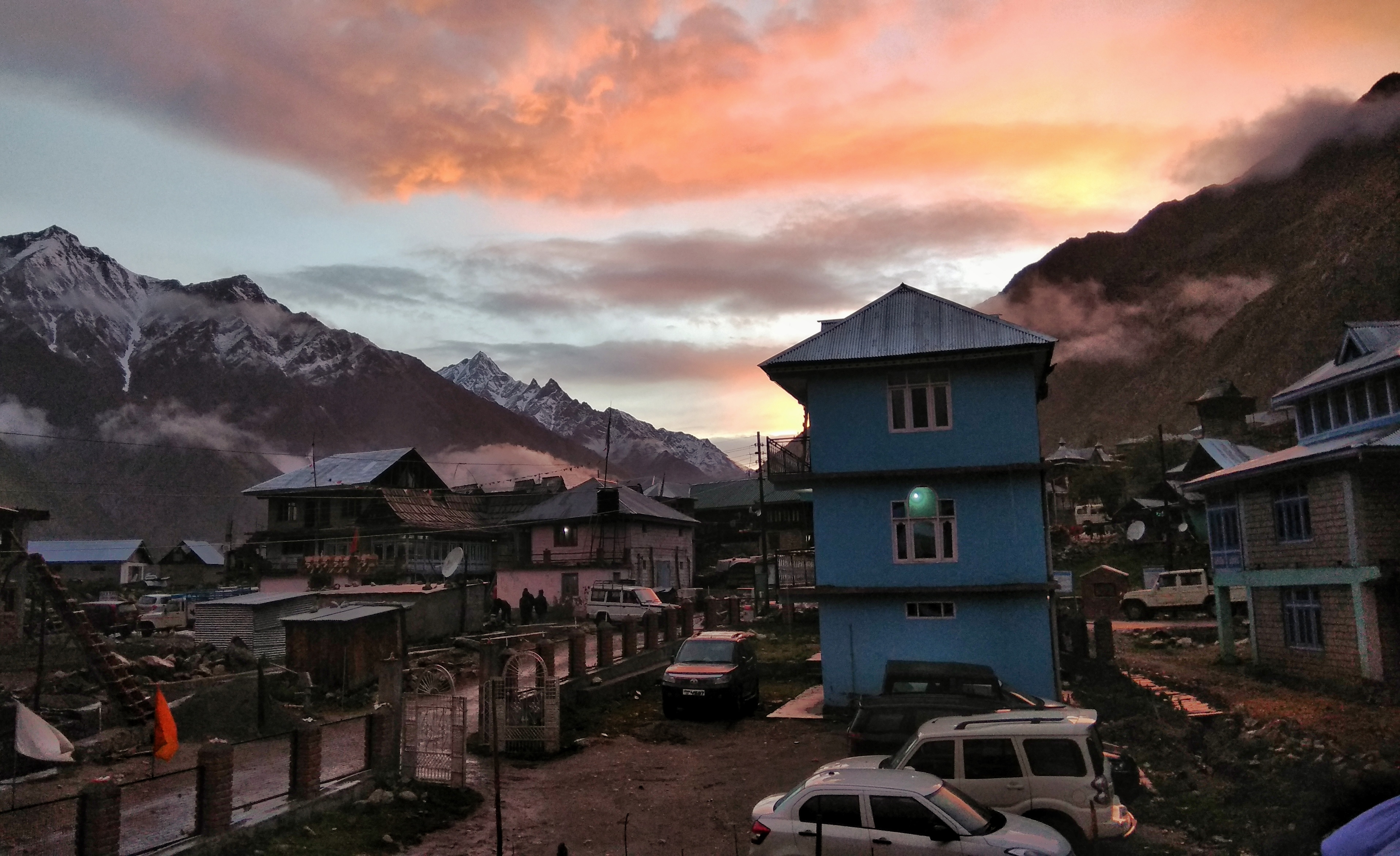
Chitkul during Dusk

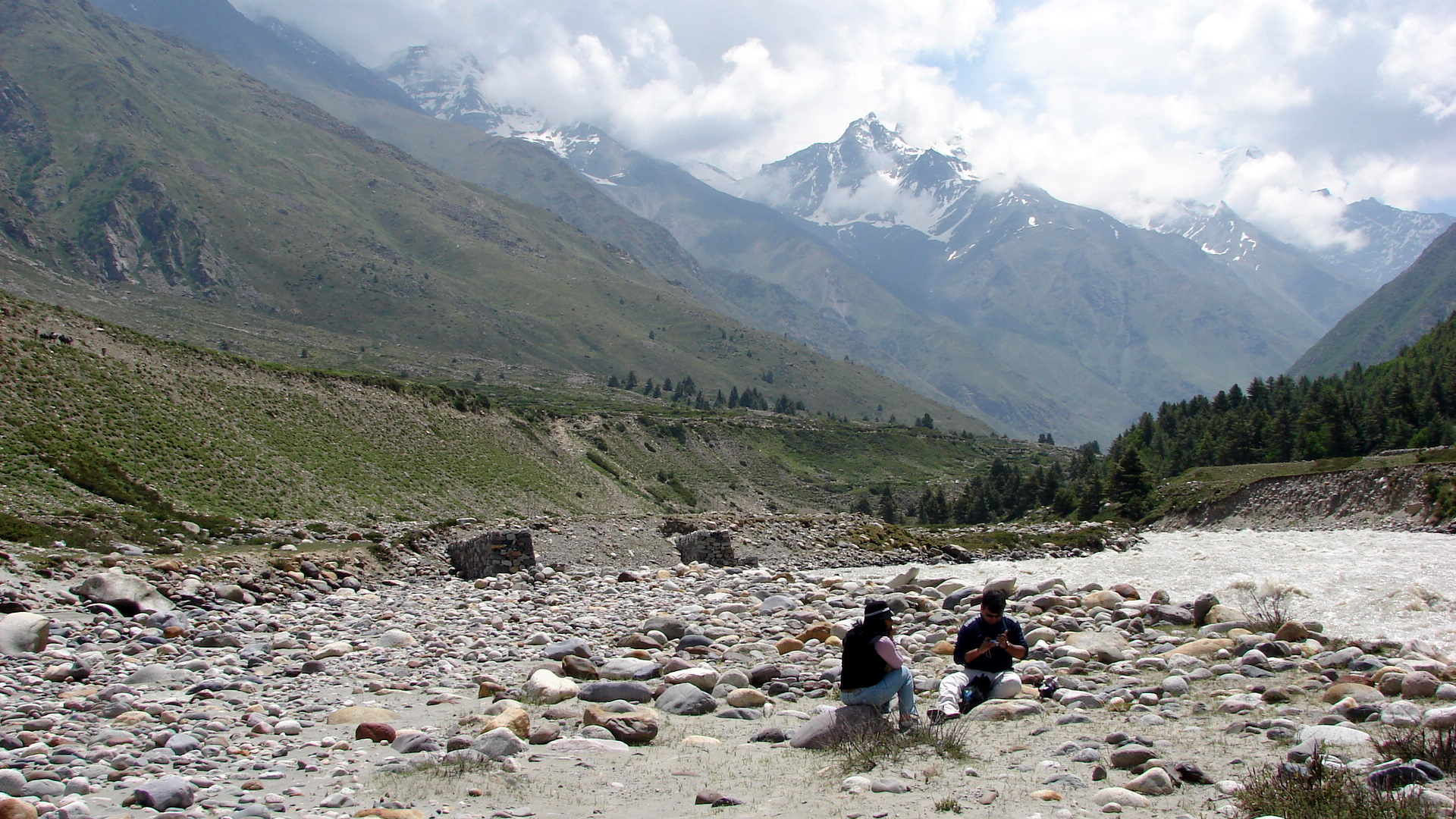
Chitkul

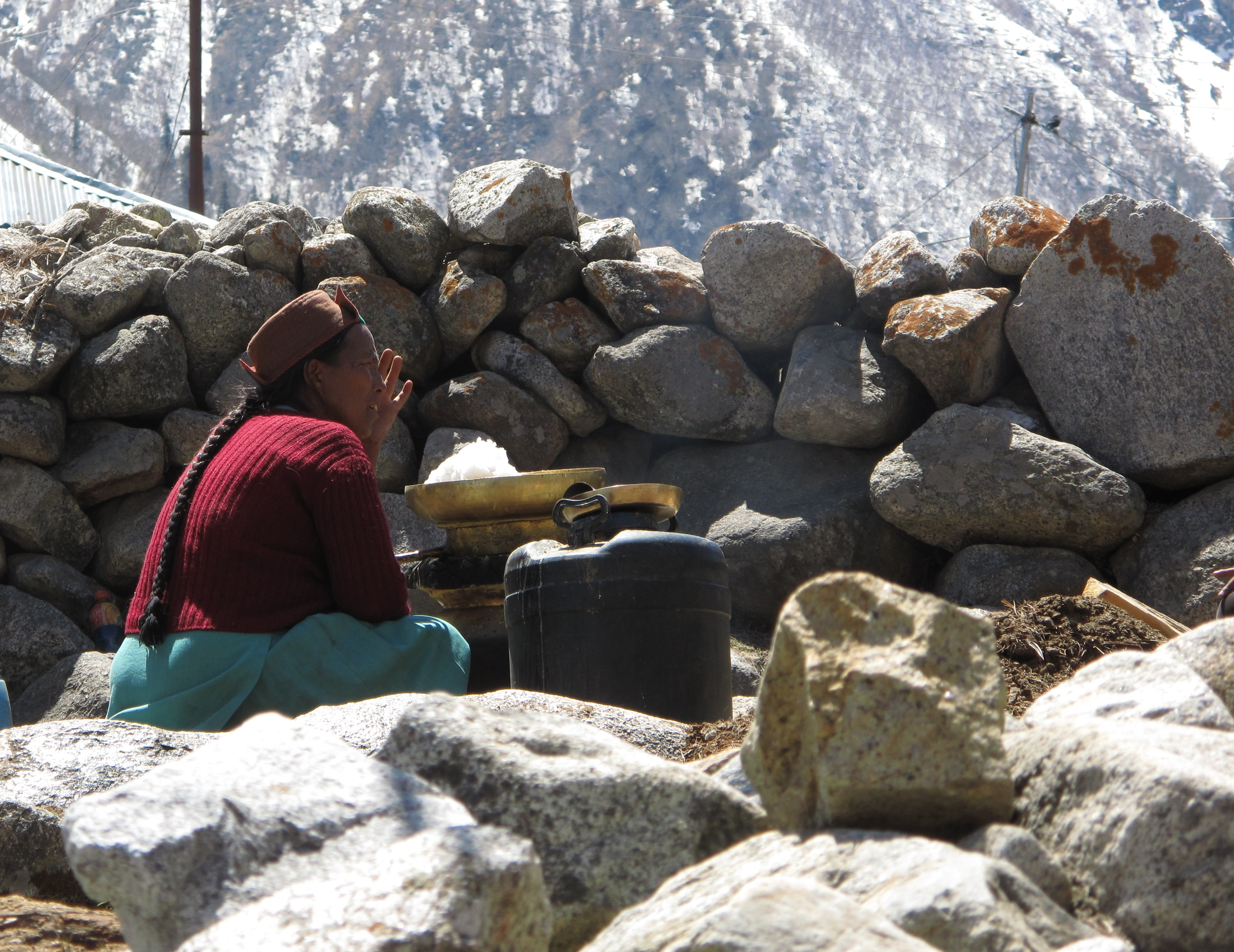
Inhabitant of Chitkul in traditional clothes of the region

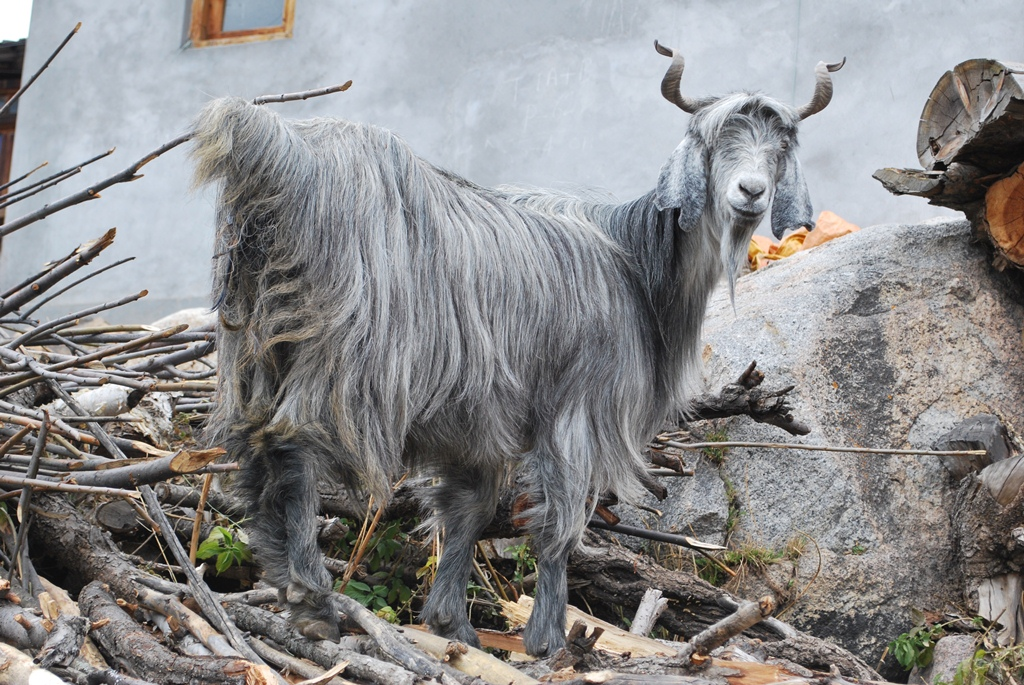
Domesticated goat

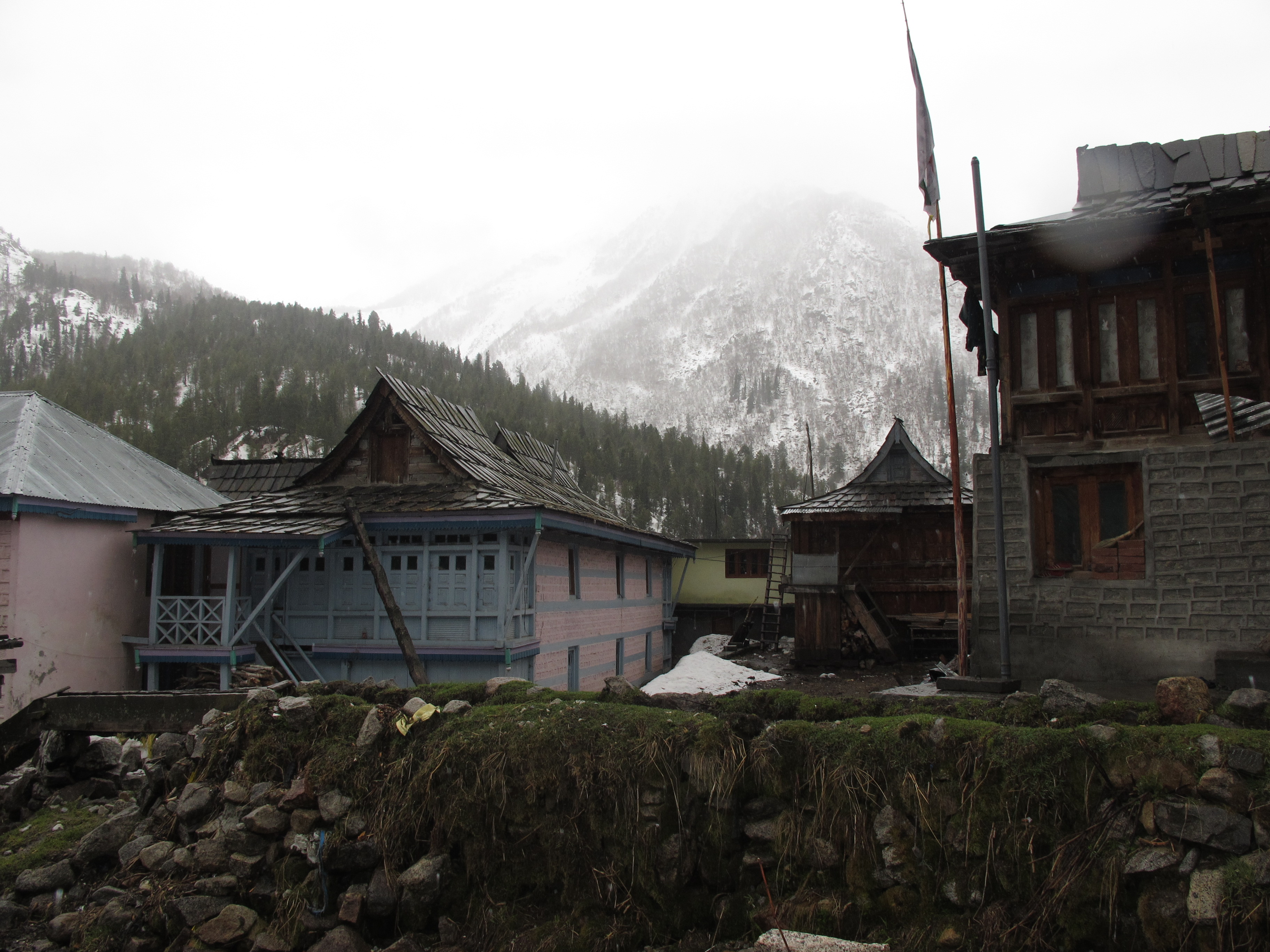
Snowing in Chitkul

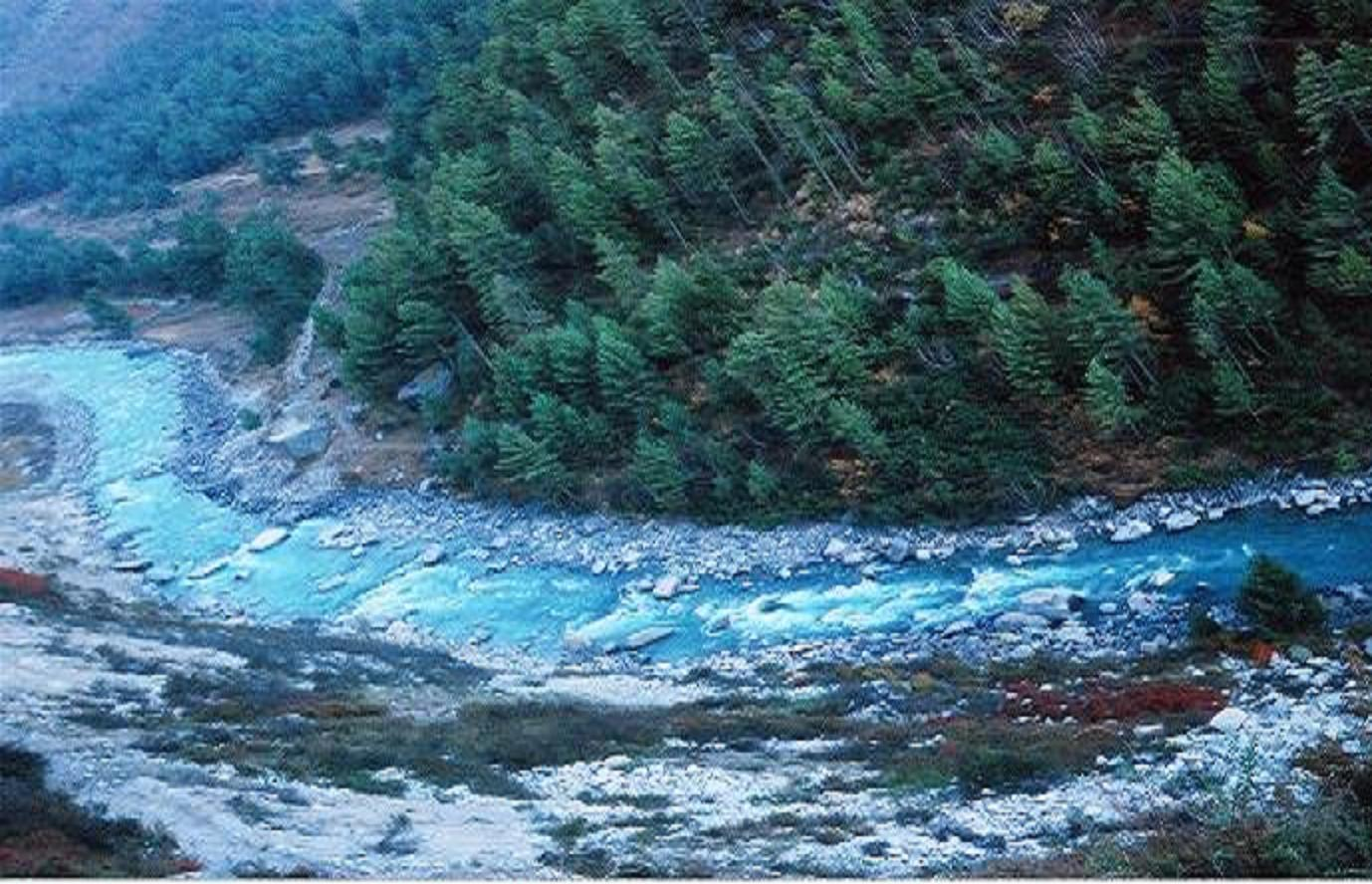
River Baspa at Chitkul

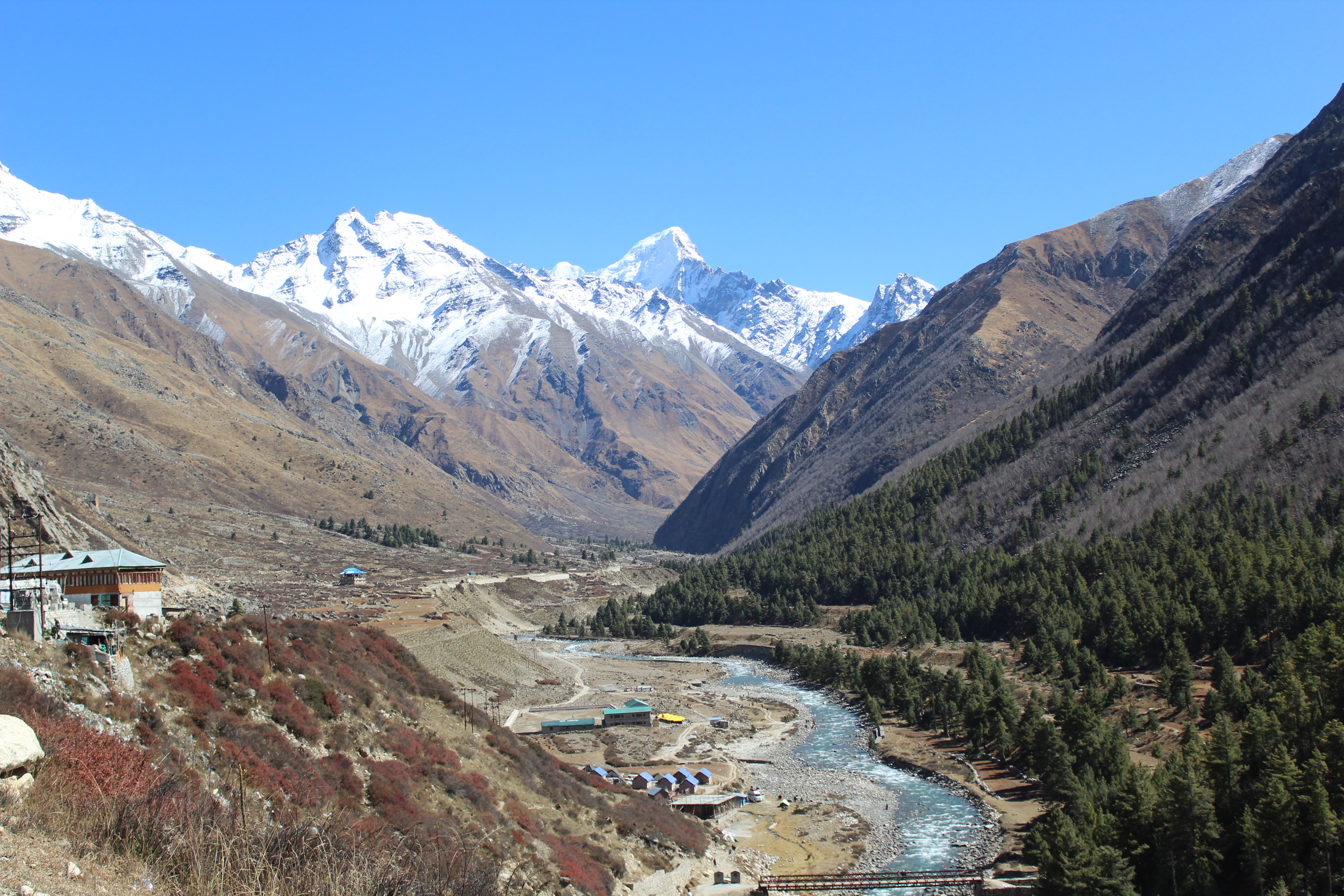
Chitkul border of India.

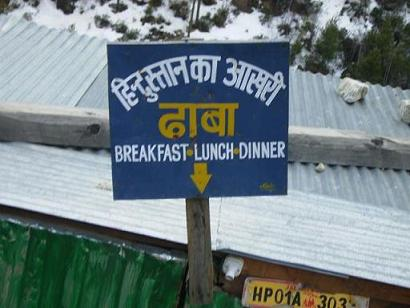
The last Dhaba

== See also ==
- Chitkuli Kinnauri language
- Liar's Dice (film), story set around Chitkul
