= Lamkhaga Pass =

Mountain pass connecting Baspa valley of Kinnaur to Bhagirathi valley of Uttarakhand

The Lamkhaga Pass (5,282 m / 17,320 ft) is one of the toughest pass in India which serves as a traditional and challenging trekking route connecting Kinnaur district of Himachal Pradesh with Harshil in Uttarakhand. The pass is a key geographical feature in a region that is both ecologically significant and strategically sensitive due to its proximity to the Indo-Tibetan border.

Harsil-Kharcham Highway will have a Lamkhaga Pass tunnel, and the highway route will also connect to Char Dham Highway and Pooh-Chumar-Hanle Highway.

== History ==
Lumkhaga Pass's first documented crossing was by Greek-British author and mountaineer, Marco Alexander Pallis, famous for his writings on Tibetan Buddhism, who crossed it in 1933. He also made a first ascent of Leo Pargial peak (6790m) in 1933.

== Physiography ==
=== Geography ===
The pass is located at a convergence of two distinct Himalayan valleys: the Baspa Valley in Himachal Pradesh and the Jalandhari Valley in Uttarakhand. The terrain on both sides of the pass is known for its difficulty, featuring steep climbs, moraines, scree slopes, and crevassed glaciers. The pass itself is often covered in snow year-round, and the route requires crossing multiple streams, including the Baspa and Jalandhari Gad rivers.

=== Geostrategic importance ===
Lumkhaga Pass holds significant geostrategic importance for India. The pass provides a direct, albeit difficult, route between the border districts of Himachal Pradesh and Uttarakhand. This connectivity is vital for the military and border security forces, as it offers an alternative to longer, more circuitous road routes. The presence of Indian military and Indo-Tibetan Border Police (ITBP) posts along the trek, particularly at locations like Dumti, underscores its role in monitoring and securing the region's sensitive border with China. The development of infrastructure in this area, including the potential for future roads, is a part of India's larger strategy to improve connectivity and assert its presence along the Line of Actual Control.

=== Ecology ===
The diverse ecology of the region is a major highlight of the trek. As the trail ascends from the lower valleys, it passes through dense forests of deodar, pine, and rhododendron. The meadows of Kyarkoti Lake, a major campsite on the Uttarakhand side, are known for their vibrant alpine flora and are surrounded by waterfalls and streams. The wildlife in the area includes species adapted to high-altitude environments, such as the langur and ibex, and various birds of prey like mountain crows and eagles. The Baspa River, which flows through the Sangla Valley, is also known for its population of freshwater fish, particularly trout. The fragile ecosystem is vulnerable to human impact, and efforts are often made to ensure trekking practices are sustainable.

== Tourism ==
The route offers a unique experience, with a dramatic landscape transition from the green, forested valleys of Kinnaur to the barren, glacial landscapes near the pass. Due to its high altitude and remote location, trekkers face challenges such as the risk of acute mountain sickness (AMS) and navigating treacherous terrain.

=== Inner Line Permit ===
Since this pass is located near Indo-Tibetan border, one needs to obtain Inner Line Permit (ILP) from the district administration of Kinnaur, Himachal Pradesh to cross the pass.

=== Trekking ===
The Lamkhaga Pass trek is widely considered one of the most difficult and demanding high-altitude treks in the Indian Himalayas, suitable only for experienced trekkers. The trek typically begins from Chitkul, the last inhabited village in the Baspa Valley on the Himachal side, and ends in Harsil, a village in the Bhagirathi river valley on the Uttarakhand side, though it can also be started from the Harshil side. The journey spans over 8 to 10 days and covers a distance of approximately 90 km (56 miles). The trekking season is limited to the short summer and post-monsoon months, typically from late May to early July and from late August to October, when snow cover is manageable.

The trek is not without risk. During a storm in October 2021, that caused the heaviest rainfall in Uttarakhand in over one hundred years, at least 12 trekkers were killed in Lamkhaga Pass. At least four of the victims were killed in an avalanche.

== Transport ==
Karcham-Harshil Road, which will run from Karcham NH-5 to Harshil, and have a road tunnel under the Lamkhaga Pass, is under construction. This will cut down the current journey, which is 450 km (280 miles) long and can take nearly 16 hours, to about 150 km (93 miles) and 2 to 3 hours. In 2024, BRO began constructing 40-km long Kharcham-Sangla-Chitkul section of Karcham-Harshil Road.

== See also ==
- India-China Border Roads
- List of mountain passes of India
