= Chitkuli Kinnauri language =

Sino-Tibetan language spoken in India

Chitkuli Kinnauri
- चित्कुली किन्नौरी
- Native to: India
- Region: Himachal Pradesh
- Native speakers: (1,060 cited 1998)
- Language family: Sino-Tibetan: Tibeto-Kanauri ?; West Himalayish; Kinnauri; Chitkuli Kinnauri

Language codes
- ISO 639-3: cik
- Glottolog: chit1279

Chitkuli Kinnauri, also known as Chhitkul-Rakchham, is a language spoken in Kinnaur district of Himachal Pradesh, India. It is spoken in two villages in the Sangla division of Kinnaur – specifically in the villages of Chitkul and Rakchham. The number of speakers was 1060 in 1998.

The language was described in 2021 by linguist Philippe Martinez.

== Notes and references ==
=== References ===
- Chamberlain; et al. (1998). A Sociolinguistic Survey of Kinnauri spoken in Kinnauri district, Himachal Pradesh, India. Kathmandu: Unpublished manuscript.
- Harvinder Negi (2012). "A sociolinguistic profile of the Kinnaura tribe" (PDF). Nepalese Linguistics. 27: 101–105.
- Martinez, Philippe A. (2020). "Documentary corpus of Chhitkul-Rakchham, an endangered Tibeto-Burman language of Northern India – Himachal Pradesh, Kinnaur District". Endangered Languages Archive.
- —— (2021). A corpus-based account of morphosyntactic evidentiality in discourse in Chhitkul-Rākchham (Thesis). SOAS University of London. doi:10.25501/SOAS.00035655.
