= Harsil =

Harshil
- village
- Interactive map of Harshil
- Location in Uttarakhand, India
- Coordinates: 31°02′N 78°44′E
- Country: India
- State: Uttarakhand
- Elevation: 2,745 m (9,006 ft)

Languages
  - Official: Hindi
  - Native: Bhotia
- Time zone: UTC+5:30 (IST)
- Postal code: 249135
- Vehicle registration: UK
- Website: uk.gov.in

Harshil (or Harsil) is a village, tourist hill station and army area located on the banks of the Bhagirathi River, on the way to Gangotri, a Hindu pilgrimage site in Uttarkashi district of the Indian state of Uttarakhand.

Situated at an altitude of 9,005 ft (2,745 metres.) from sea level, Harsil lies 78 km. from Uttarkashi, and 30 km away from the Gangotri National Park which is spread across 1,553 square km. The hill station is well- known for its natural environment and apple production.

== Background ==
=== Etymology ===
According to the local legend, Harsil got its name from the rivers Bhagirathi and the Jalandhari as once they had an argument over their significance. Vishnu, also known as Hari, was asked to intervene. He turned himself into a great stone, a shila, and absorbed their anger. Even today, after Hari-shila (or Harsil), the waters of the two rivers have become a little less turbulent.

=== History ===
Harshil lies on the old caravan trail between Tibet Autonomous Region and India, where trade & marriages once flourished.

Harshil has been under the Kingdom of Garhwal. In 1815 Anglo-Nepal War, British Raj sided with the Kingdom of Garwal and as a reward they were given the eastern half of Garhwal.

In mid-nineteenth century, apples and rajma cultivation was introduced to Harshil by Frederick Wilson, which became Himachal's main cash crops. In 1842, "Frederick Wilson", also called "Frederick "Pahari" Wilson" and "Pahari Wilson", a 25-year-old Englishman, deserted the East India Company’s army and fled to remote Harshil where he made fortune by logging deodar trees and selling those to British for the construction of railways. He was nicknamed "Raja of Harshil" by locals, even issued own coins. He was a friend of A. O. Hume and Rudyard Kipling, later's novel The Man Who Would Be King was inspired by the story of Wilson. Journalist Robert Hutchison wrote a book "The Raja of Harsil" on Wilson. A local deity's priest cursed him for destroying the forests and ecology. After he died in 1883, his 3 sons squandered the inheritance and died, his last known descendant, who had joined the Indian Air Force, died in air crash after the World War II. Sunderlal Bahuguna, founder of Chipko Movement, blamed Wilson for Garhwal's ecological destruction. Marco Pallis, Peaks and Lamas (New York, Knopf, 1940) includes an account of a visit to Harsil and environs in the 1930s.

== Geography ==
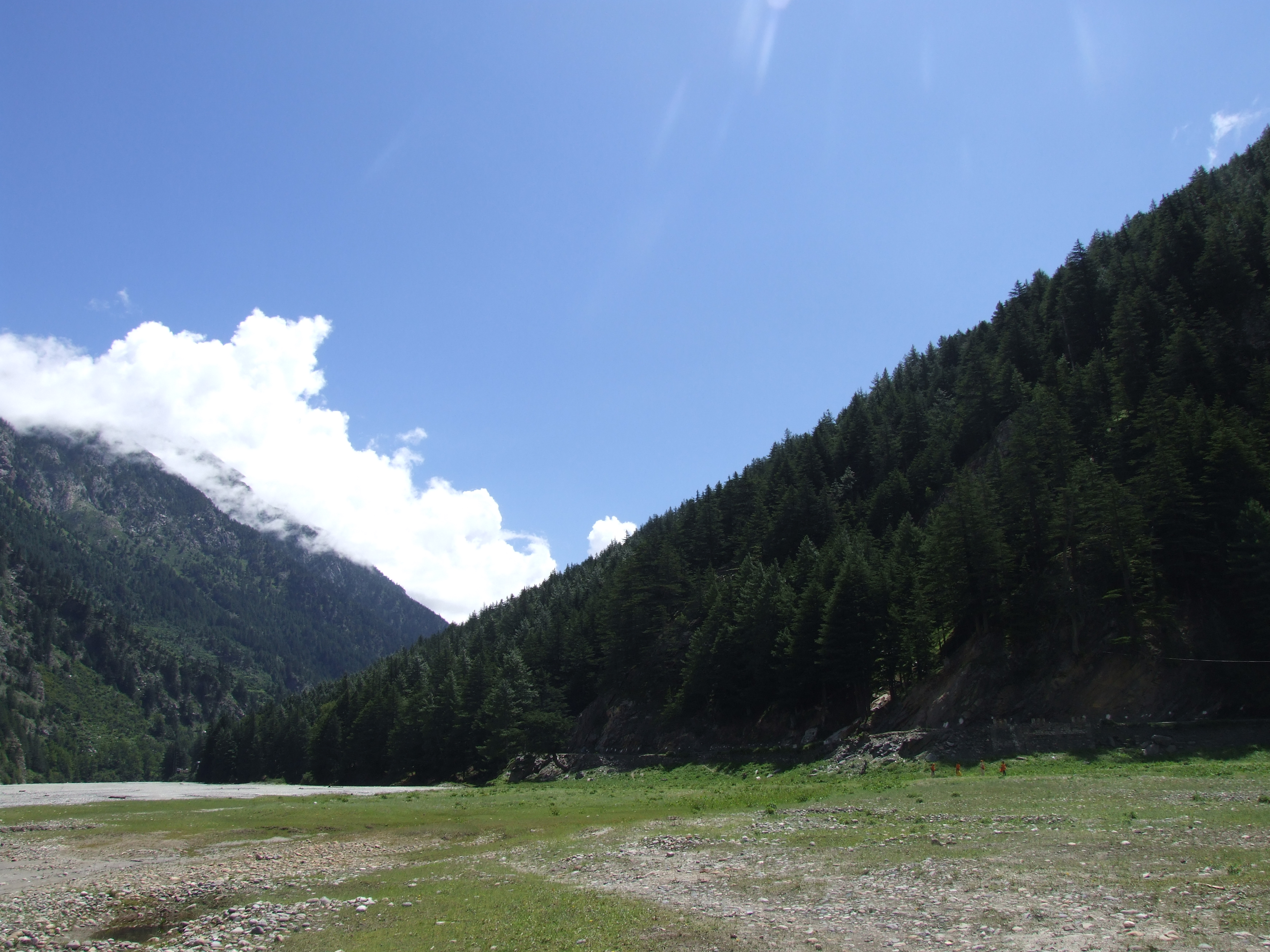
Ganges below Gangotri, near Harshil.

Harshil Valley has a cluster of around eight villages near the India-China border. Upper reaches of Harshil are connected to Nelang Valley. It is also connected to the Baspa Valley by several passes including the Lamkhaga Pass.

== Demography ==
A small number of indigenous (of Nelong valley) Jadhs, an ethnic group of the Bhotiyas, have lived here (since hundreds of years) as Harsil valley was enroute Nelong-Rishikesh and practiced transhumance. They speak Bhoti language resembling Tibetan. There is also a sizeable Tibetan settlement in a close vicinity to ITBP Campus housing a Stupa (Buddhist Burial Mound) and beautifully carved wooden houses.

== Military setup ==
=== Army area ===
Harshil army area is a base camp of Garhwal Scouts and Indo-Tibetan Border Police (ITBP). Since it is close to the disputed India-China Border, it is of military significance. On 6 November 2018, Prime Minister Narendra Modi visited Harshil to celebrate Diwali with ITBP soldiers.

=== Defence Institute of Bio-Energy Research ===
Harshil has a field station of the Defence Institute of Bio-Energy Research (DIBER), earlier known as the Defence Agricultural Research Laboratory (DARL), run by the Defence Research and Development Organisation (DRDO). DARL, engaged in the research and development of bioenergy as well as the sustainable and eco-friendly high altitude agro-technologies in the Indian Himalayan Region for the use of Indian Military, has developed a range of vegetable varieties suitable for mid to high altitude. Haldwani in April 2008. During the Golden Jubilee year of DRDO, the laboratory was renamed from DARL to Defence Institute of Bio-Energy Research (DIBER) with a new mandate and thrust areas.

DIBER has its origin in an Agriculture Research Unit (ARU) established 1960s at Sitoli, which was renamed to DARL in 1990s and to DIBER in 2008. Harsil field research station was established in May 1973.

== Tourism ==
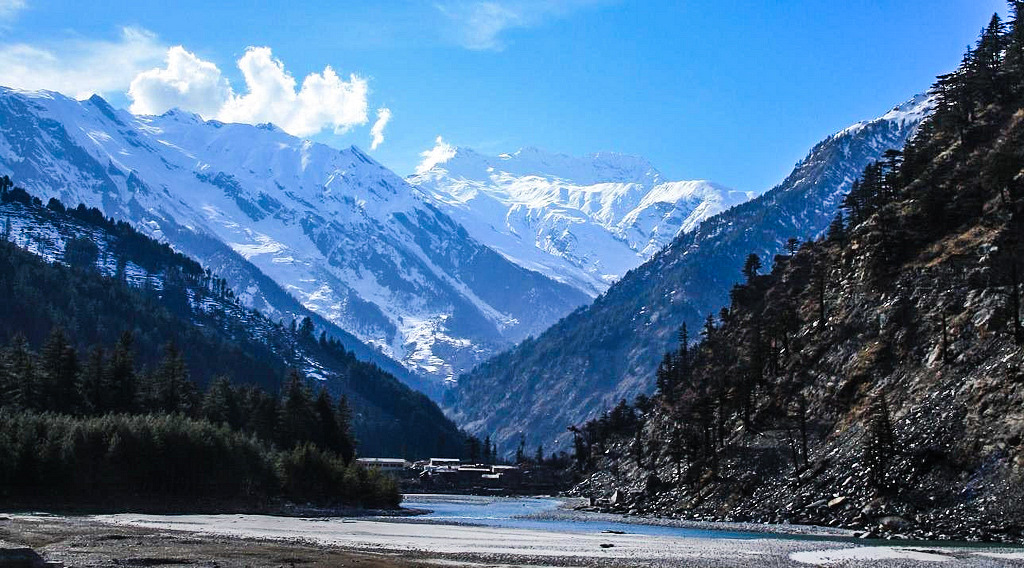
Harshil valley

=== Gangotri pilgrimage ===
Harshil is part of Chota Char Dham's Gangotri yatra (pilgrimage) route. The idol of the Hindu River Goddess Ganga (Ganges) is brought down from the shrine at Gangotri in the upper Himalayas after Diwali and kept at 'Mukhba' village near Harshil. It remains there throughout the winter when Gangotri is snowbound and inaccessible.

=== Eco alpine mountain tourism ===
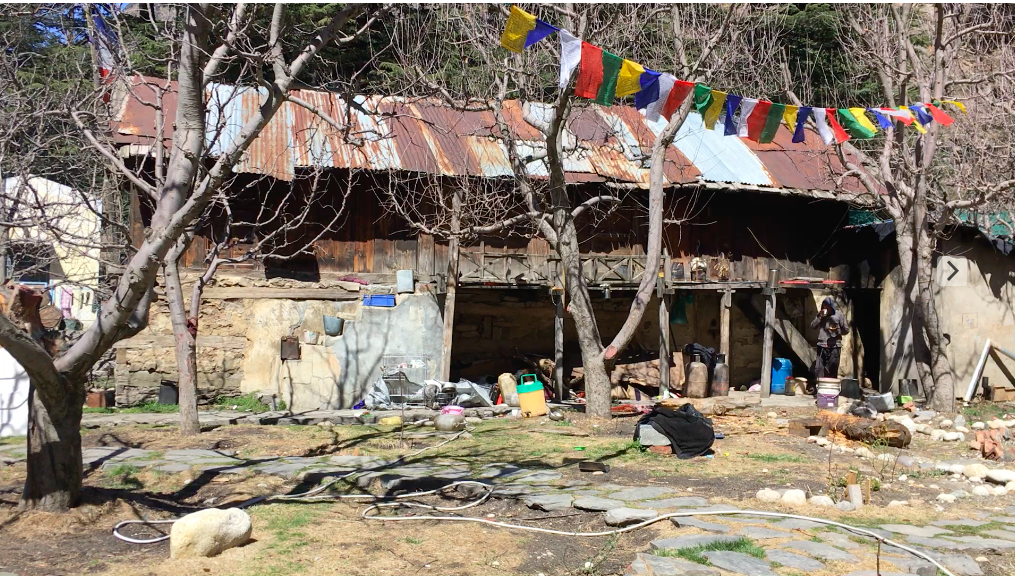
Front view of a Traditional House at Harsil, Uttarakhand.

Government is developing the cluster of 8 villages of Harshil valley, as well as Nelang Valley for the tourism by creating tourist facilities. India's first snow leopard conservation centre is being established in the region. During the summer tourist season, path to Gartang Gali cliff-side hanging stairway is open, along which homestays in the native villages are developed. Natives of the border villages, Sukki, Mukhba, Harshil, Bagori, Dharali, Jhala, Jaspur and Purali are trained as nature conservation and adventure guides for eco-tourism trekking, bird-watching, flora and fauna. Harshil town is being beautified, tourist lights being installed similar to those at Nainital and Mussoorie, telescopes being set up at several places for star gazing.

== Transport ==
Gangotri Char Dham Railway's railhead at Maneri (62 km south on NH-34) is the nearest railway station. Nearest airports are Dehradun Airport (220 km southwest) and Shimla Airport (375 km west).

Harsil is located approximately 450 km from Delhi (a 12–13 hour journey), 244 km from Haridwar (7–8 hours), and 200 km from Dehradun (6–7 hours). Regular bus and taxi services operate along these routes.

Harshil is on NH-34 within the Char Dham Highway network.

Karcham-Harshil Road, Rs 2,500-3,000 crore 150 km long route, was announced in 2020 which will link Karcham on NH-5 (site of Karcham Wangtoo Hydroelectric Plant) to Harshil, both in Himachal Pradesh. A road tunnel will be built under the Lamkhaga Pass on the Karcham-Harshil Road. Karcham-Harshil Road will cut down present 450 km long distance, which take nearly 16 hours, to just nearly 150 km or 2 to 3 hours. Since Karcham and Harshil are 26 km and 52 km away from the Line of Actual Control (LAC) respectively, the new road will also enable the faster deployment of troop. This new road, to be constructed by Border Roads Organisation (BRO) at a cost between Rs 2,500 to Rs 3,000 crore, is in addition to the 73 previously approved India-China Border Roads (ICBR). In 2024, BRO began constructing 40-km long Kharcham-Sangla-Chitkul section of Karcham-Harshil Road. Karcham-Harshil Road is part of the longer Chumar-Pooh-Kharcham-Harsil route being constructed.

== See also ==
- List of hill stations in India
- Tourism in India
