= Liar's Dice (film) =

2013 Indian film by Geetu Mohandas

- Official film poster
- Directed by: Geetu Mohandas
- Written by: Geetu Mohandas
- Produced by: Alan McAlex; Ajay Rai
- Starring: Geetanjali Thapa; Nawazuddin Siddiqui; Manya Gupta; Vikram Bhagra; Murari Kumar
- Cinematography: Rajeev Ravi
- Edited by: B. Ajithkumar
- Music by: John Bosters
- Production company: Jar Pictures
- Release dates: 5 October 2013 (MAMI); 16 January 2014 (Sundance)
- Running time: 104 minutes
- Country: India
- Language: Hindi

Liar's Dice is a 2013 Indian Hindi-language road movie written and directed by Geetu Mohandas and starring Geetanjali Thapa and Nawazuddin Siddiqui. The film tells the story of a young mother from a remote village who, going in search of her missing husband, goes missing herself. The film examines the human cost of migration to cities and the exploitation of migrant workers.

The production is Mohandas' feature film debut; she had previously made the short film Kelkkunndo in 2008, which received wide acclaim. Liar's Dice had its world premiere at the Mumbai Film Festival in October 2013, where it took part in the Indian competition section. In January 2014, the film was screened at the Sundance Film Festival and the International Film Festival Rotterdam. It won a special jury award at the Sofia International Film Festival.

Liar's Dice went on to receive two awards at the 61st National Film Awards: Best Actress for Geetanjali Thapa, and Best Cinematography for Rajeev Ravi. The film was India's official entry at the 87th Academy Awards for Best Foreign Language Film, but was not nominated. Art director Ajay Sharma, who had worked on movies such as Happy Journey (2014), won the Best Art Director Award at the Maharashtra State Film Awards.

== Synopsis ==
The canvas of the film stretches from a small village in the mountains called Chitkul on the border with China, to the big city of Delhi. Kamala, a young mother from a tribal community, her three-year-old daughter, and her daughter's pet goat, embark on a journey to find her husband who has been missing for the last five months. Along the way, they meet an army deserter, Nawazuddin, who accompanies them. They travel together until they reach the house of Kamala's husband's boss, but he is away. Kamala and Nawazuddin quarrel and part ways. She decides to go to Delhi to search for her husband and runs into Nawazuddin at the train station. He decides to accompany her and her daughter once more, in order to keep them safe. They arrive in Delhi together and a series of mishaps ensues. Kamala keeps trying to call her husband's phone and finally hears a ringtone. The ringing appears to be coming from Nawazuddin's bag, however. Kamala opens the bag and finds her husband's wallet, his watch, and his belongings. At the end of the film, Nawazuddin is seen working in construction and Kamala is back in her village.

== Cast ==
- Nawazuddin Siddiqui as Nawazuddin
- Geetanjali Thapa as Kamala
- Manya Gupta as Manya
- Vikram Bhagra as Hotel owner
- Murari Kumar as Hotel boy

== Production ==
Director Geetu Mohandas is a noted actress in Malayalam cinema. She wrote the script to the film in 2007, before her debut short Kelkkunndo (Are You Listening) in 2008. However, she was unable to get the film financed due to the unusual storyline and a relatively unknown cast. Nevertheless, after the critical success received at the International Film Festival Rotterdam (IFFR) for her short film, she managed to get a project development grant of €10,000 (around Rs.8.45 lakh now) from the IFFR's Hubert Bals Fund.

The film faced difficulties in raising funds before Alan McAlex and Ajay G. Rai, producers from Jar Pictures, stepped in. The final project was co-produced with Mohandas' own production company, Unplugged.

Liar's Dice was shot on a low budget using a small crew in under a month in March 2012. It was filmed on location in the village of Chitkul in Kinnaur district, Shimla, and various locations in Delhi, including the Jama Masjid. The cinematography was done by Mohandas' husband, Rajeev Ravi, who had previously worked on movies such as Dev.D (2009) and Gangs of Wasseypur (2012).

== Reception ==
On the review aggregator website Rotten Tomatoes, 67% of 6 critics' reviews are positive, with an average rating of 5.3/10. Variety called the film a "quietly effective debut".

== Awards ==
- 61st National Film Awards
  - National Film Award for Best Actress – Geetanjali Thapa
  - National Film Award for Best Cinematography – Rajeev Ravi
- Sofia International Film Festival, 2014
  - Won Special Jury Award
- NYIFF 2014
  - Won Best Actress
  - Won Best Film Award in international competition
- Pesaro International Film Festival, 2014
  - Won Lino Micciche Award for Best Film
- Granada Cines del Sur Film Festival
  - Won Bronce Alhambra award

== See also ==
- List of submissions to the 87th Academy Awards for Best Foreign Language Film
- List of Indian submissions for the Academy Award for Best Foreign Language Film
- Liar's dice
