= List of mountain peaks of Himachal Pradesh =

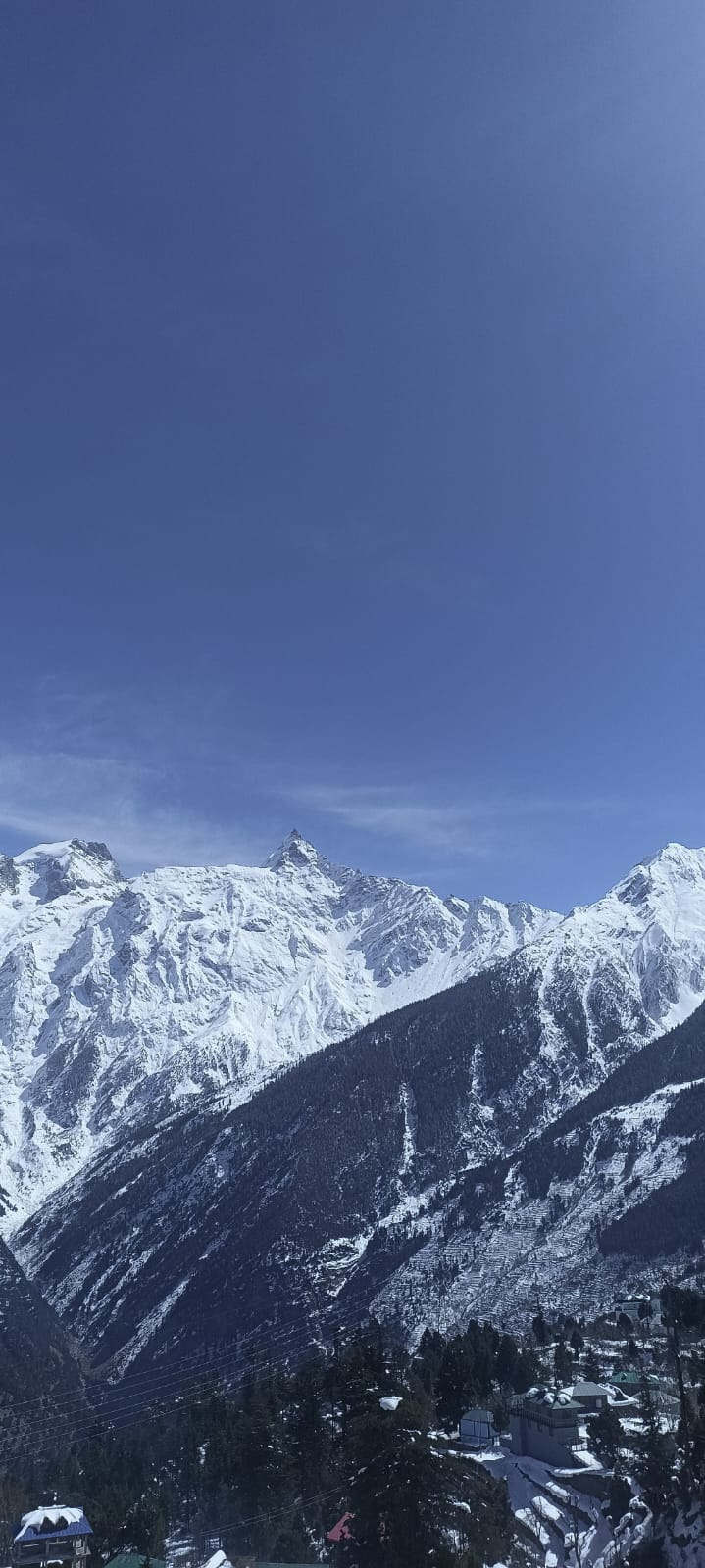
Mountain peak ( Himachal Pradesh)

This is a list of the highest mountain peaks of the Indian state of Himachal Pradesh.

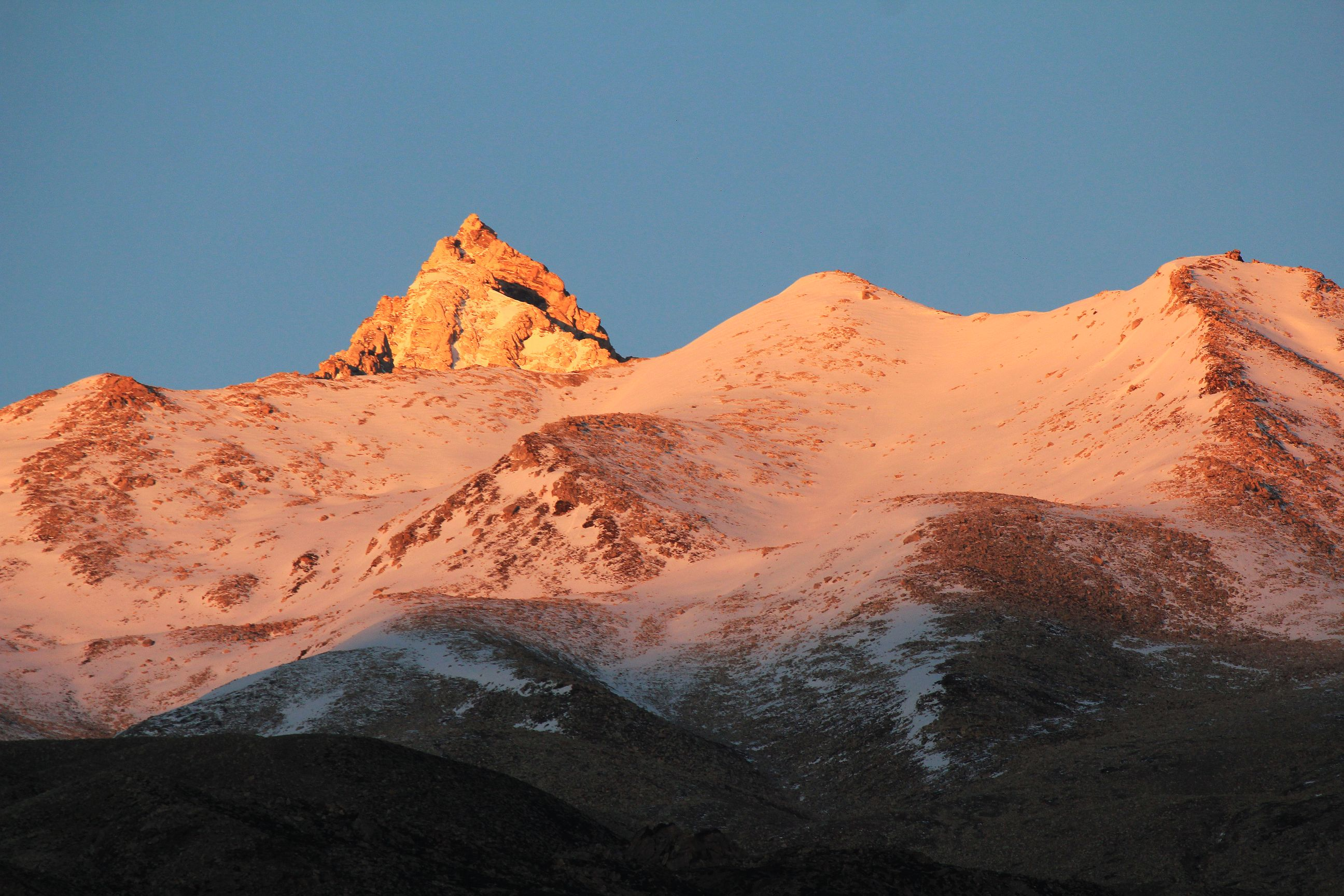
View of Reo Purgyil, peak in Himachal Pradesh (Kinnaur)

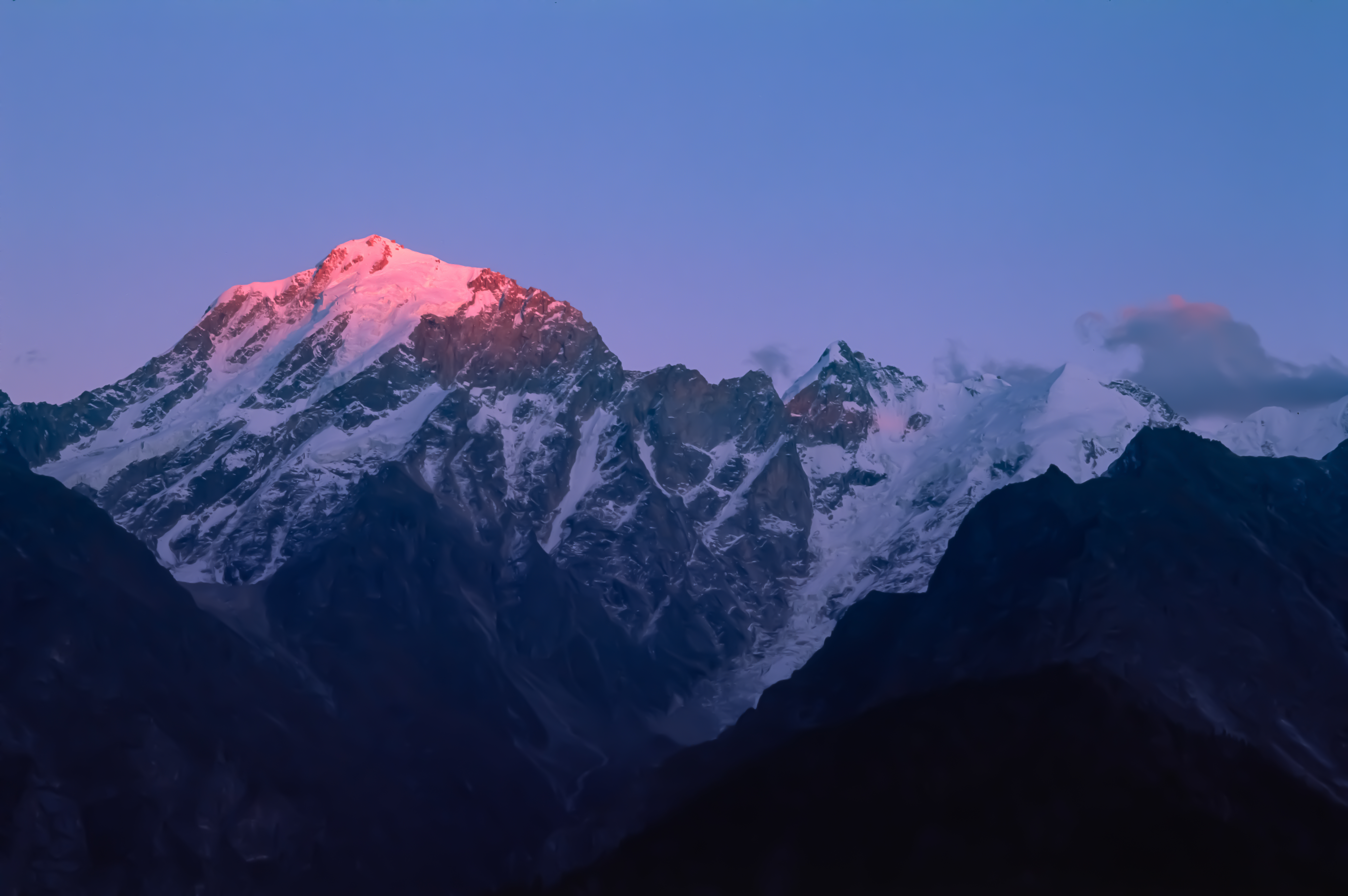
Kinnaur Kailash range from Kalpa, Kinnaur

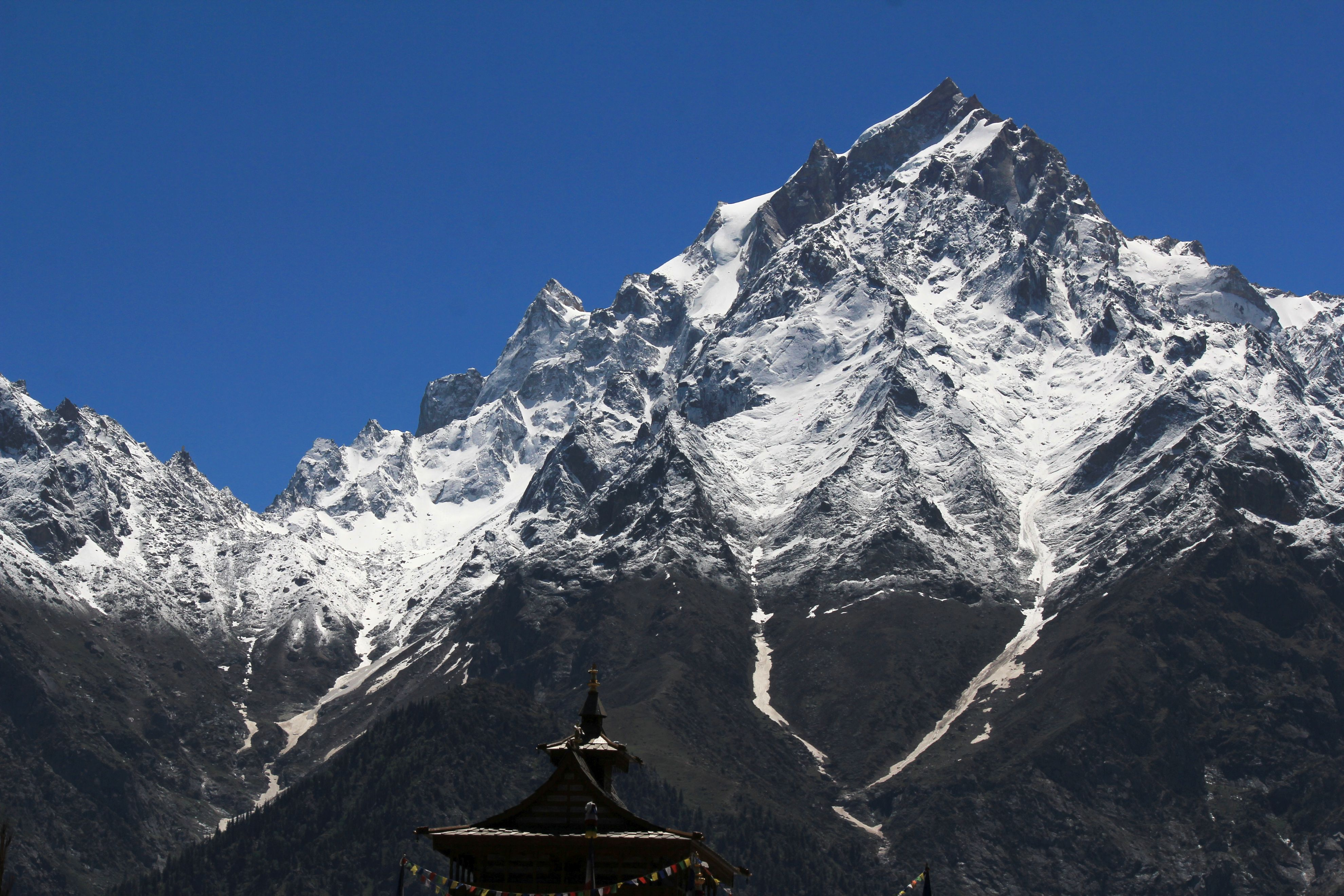
Kinnaur Kailash Shivling and Jorkanden with glimpse of top portion of Kalpa Temple

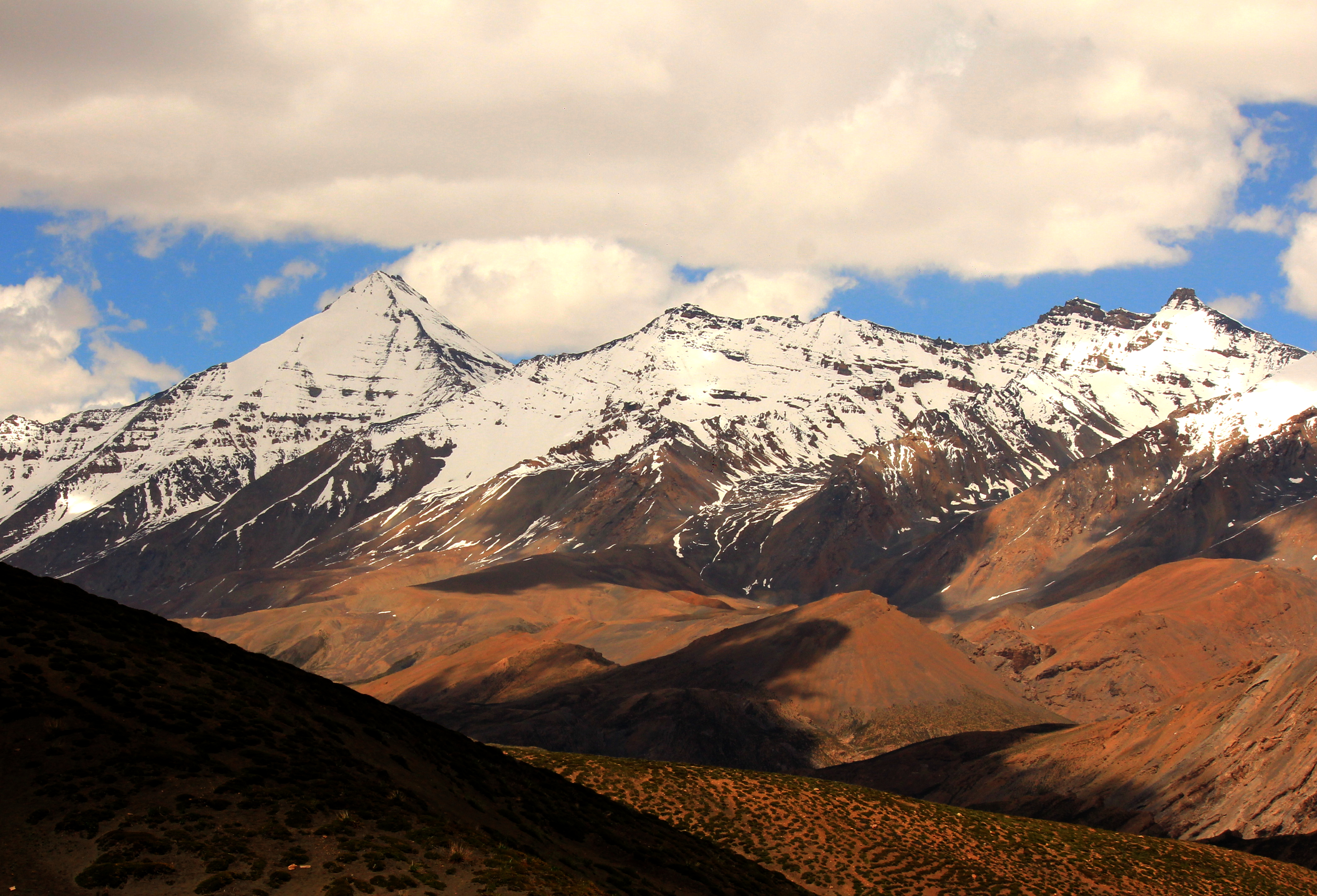
View of Chau Chau Kang Nilda peak near Demul village

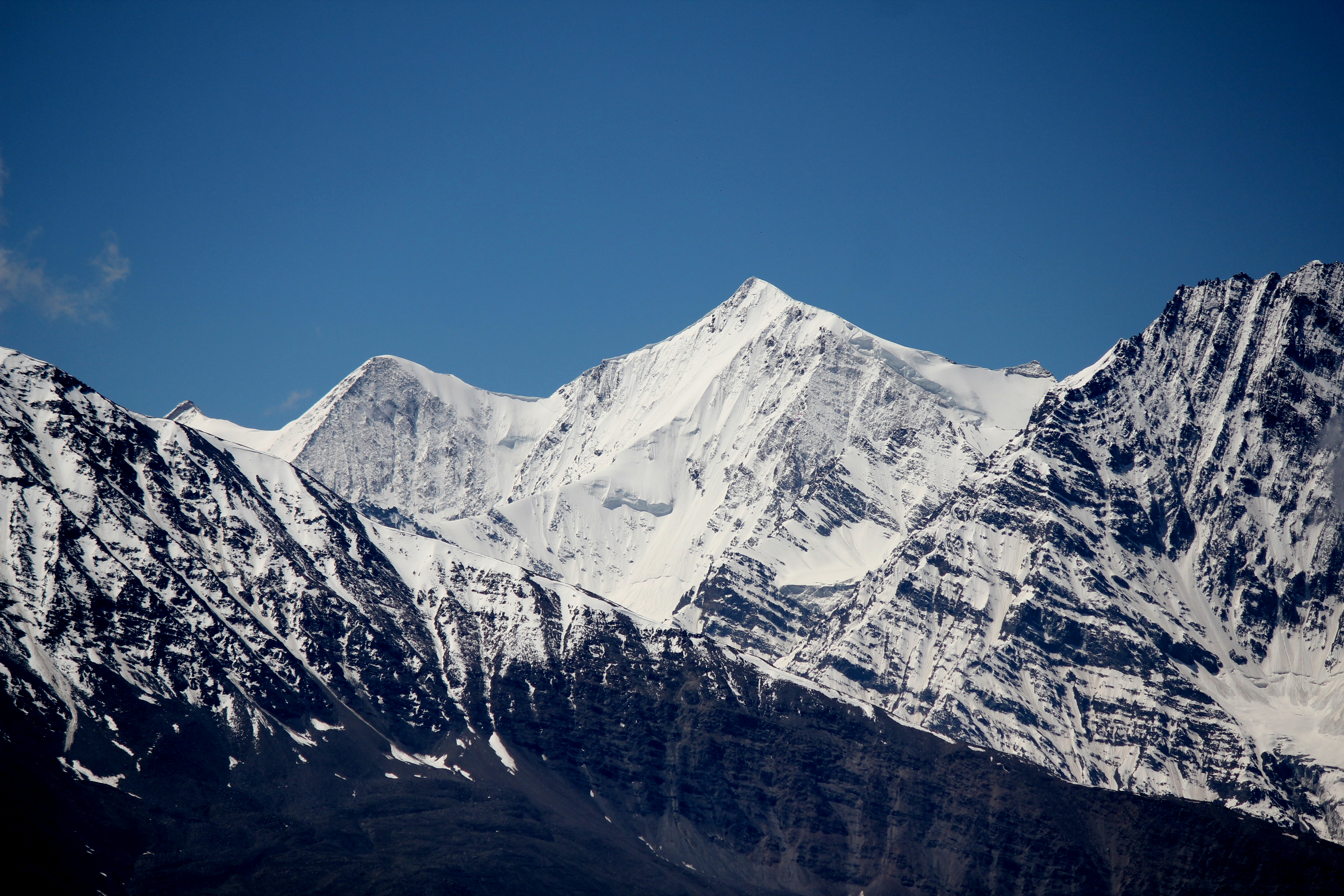
View of Gangchhua peak on the way to Tashigang village from Nako

Name of the peak	Altitude (meters)	Location		
Reo Purgyil	6816	Kinnaur		
Gya	6795	Spiti		
Leo Purgyil	6791	Kinnaur		
Ninjeri	6646	Kinnaur		
Undung Kangri	6642	Lahaul and Spiti		
Parvati Parvat	6633	Kullu		
Manirang	6593	Kinnaur, Spiti		
Granite Peak	6585	Kinnaur		
Rangrik Rang	6553	Kinnaur		
Kullu Pumori	6553	Lahaul and Spiti		
Mulkila	6517	Lahaul and Spiti		
Jorkanden	6473	Kinnaur		
Menthosa	6443	Chamba		
Umashila	5294	Kullu		
Papsura	6446	Kullu, Lahaul and Spiti		
Dharamsura	6446	Kullu, Lahaul and Spiti		
Gyagar	6400	Lahaul and Spiti		
Dibibokri Pyramid	6408	Kullu		
Gyephang	6400	Lahaul and Spiti		
Phawarang	6349	Kinnaur		
Koa Rang IV	6340	Lahaul and Spiti		
Kangla Tarbo 1	6315	Lahaul and Spiti		
Chau Chau Kang Nilda	6303	Lahaul and Spiti		
Baihali Jot	6,295	Lahaul and Spiti, Chamba		
Gang Chua	6,288	Kinnaur		
Lakhang	6272	Lahaul and Spiti		
C B 13	6264	Lahaul and Spiti		
Koa Rang V	6258	Lahaul and Spiti		
C B 12	6248	Lahaul and Spiti		
Shigrila	6,230	Lahaul and Spiti		
C B 10 (Tara Pahar)	6228	Lahaul and Spiti		
Corner Peak	6227	Kinnaur		
Indrasan	6,220	Kullu		
Shikar Beh	6,200	Lahaul and Spiti, Kangra		
Koa Rang II	6,187	Lahaul and Spiti		
Koa Rang VI	6,187	Lahaul and Spiti		
Koa Rang I	6,157	Lahaul and Spiti		
Koa Rang III	6,154	Lahaul and Spiti		
Ramabang	6,135	Lahaul and Spiti		
C B 9	6114	Lahaul and Spiti		
Goutam Parbat	6113	Lahaul and Spiti		
Mount Yunum (mountain)	6,111	Lahaul and Spiti		
Koa Rang VII	6,096	Lahaul and Spiti		
C B 31	6096	Lahaul and Spiti		
C B 54	6088	Lahaul and Spiti		
C B 14	6078	Lahaul and Spiti		
Mukar Beh	6,070	Lahaul and Spiti, Kangra		
Gepang Goh	6,050	Lahaul and Spiti		
Shipki	6,068	Kinnaur		
Kinnaur Kailash	6,050	Kinnaur		
Sanakdeik Jot	6,045	Chamba, Lahaul and Spiti		
Deo Tibba	6,001	Kullu		
Solang	5,975	Kullu		
Pir Panjal	5,972	Chamba		
C B 11	5965	Lahaul and Spiti		
C B 16	5962	Lahaul and Spiti		
		Kanamo Peak	5,964	Lahaul and Spiti
Maiwa Kandinu	5,944	Kullu		
C B 48(Tambu)	5875	Lahaul and Spiti		
C B 32	5866	Lahaul and Spiti		
Hanuman Tibba	5,860	Kullu/Kangra		
Bara Kanda	5,860	Chamba		
C B 18	5858	Lahaul and Spiti		
C B 26	5848	Lahaul and Spiti		
C B 42 (Asha Giri)	5831	Lahaul and Spiti		
C B 19	5772	Lahaul and Spiti		
Chachi Mug	5768	Lahaul and Spiti		
C B 57	5746	Lahaul and Spiti		
C B 22	5708	Lahaul and Spiti		
C B 20	5705	Lahaul and Spiti		
Pishu	5,672	Kinnaur, Shimla		
Manimahesh Kailash	5,660	Chamba		
Saltu Da Par	5,650	Lahaul and Spiti		
Gushu	5,607	Kinnaur, Shimla		
Raldang	5,499	Kinnaur		
Shitindhar	5,290	Kullu		
Srikhand Mahadev	5,182	Kullu		
Thamsar	5,080	Chamba		
Lachalunga	5,060	Lahaul and Spiti		
Murangla	5,060	Lahaul and Spiti		
Shringla	4,999	Lahaul and Spiti		
Inder Kila	4,940	Kullu		
Pin Parbati	5,319	Kullu, Lahaul and spiti		
Pin Bahba	4,890	Lahaul and spiti, Kinnaur		
Ghoralantinu	4,760	Kullu/Kangra		
Chanshal Peak	4,520	Shimla		
Patalsu	4,470	Kullu		
Gauri Devi Ka Tibba	4,030	Chamba		
Nagru	4,020	Mandi		
Hargaran	3,850	Lahaul and Spiti		
Narshing Tibba	3,730	Chamba		
Choordhar	3,647	Shimla/Sirmaur		
Shacha	3,540	Kullu		
Hatu Peak	3,400	Shimla		
Shikari Devi	3,359	Mandi		
Kuppar Peak	3,350	Shimla		
Cholang	3,270	Kangra		
Kamlodi Mata Top	3,115	Shimla		
Kamrunag	3,065	Mandi		
Billing Top	3,050	Kangra		
Tunga Mata Top	3,000	Mandi		
Derthu Mata Top (Chhichad Tibba)	2,995	Shimla		
Shetadhar	2,990	Mandi		
Propt Dhar	2,900	Mandi		
Devidarh	2,872	Mandi		
Shali Tibba	2,870	Shimla		
Dlondar Peak	2,854	Shimla		
Nag Tikkar	2,812	Shimla		
Parashar	2,730	Mandi		
Winch Camp	2,700	Mandi		

== See also ==
- List of districts of Himachal Pradesh by highest point
