= Nako Lake =

Lake in Himachal Pradesh, India

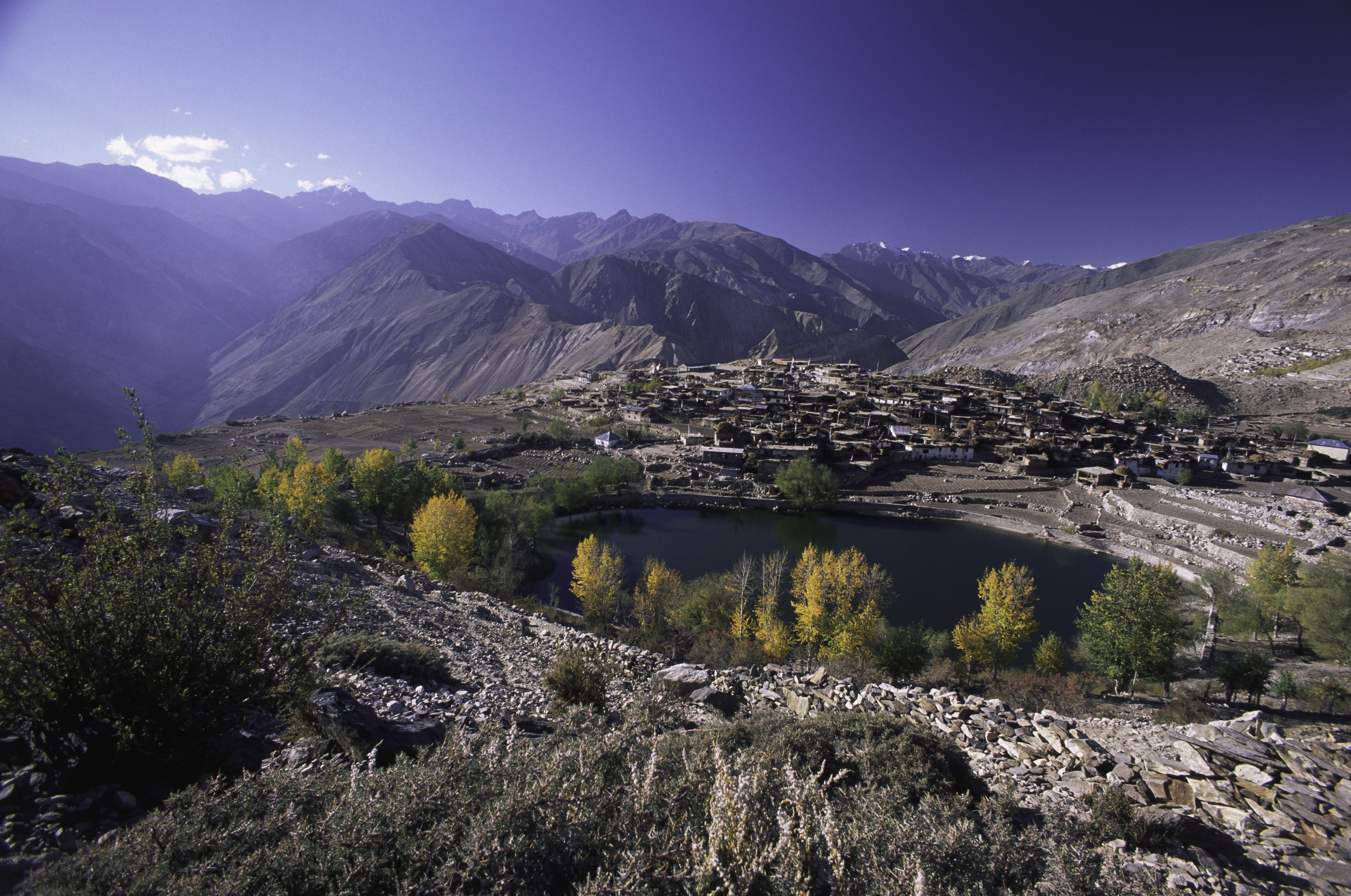

- Location within Himachal Pradesh Location within India
- Location: Kinnaur district
- Coordinates: 31.879639°N 78.627632°E
- Type: High altitude lake
- Basin countries: India
- Surface elevation: 3,662 m (12,014 ft)
- References: Himachal Pradesh Tourism Dep.

Nako Lake is a high-altitude lake in the Pooh sub-division of the Kinnaur district of the state of Himachal Pradesh in India. It forms part of the boundary of Nako village and is named after it. It is about 3,662 metres (12,014 ft) above sea level. The size of the lake is around 500 meters long and 200 meters wide and the depth of the lake is estimated to be around 60 meters. The lake is surrounded by willow and poplar trees. Near the lake, there are four Buddhist temples. Near this place, there is a foot-like impression ascribed to the saint Padmasambhava. Several miles away there is a village called Tashigang around which there are several caves where it is believed that Guru Padmasambhava meditated and gave discourse to followers. There is a waterfall nearby which has snow water falling like a river of milk. Legend says that it is a heavenly realm of fairies. In one of the caves, you are still able to see the live footprints of these fairies or other demigods. It is a sacred place for the people of these valleys. Followers come from as far a place as Ladakh and Spiti Valley.

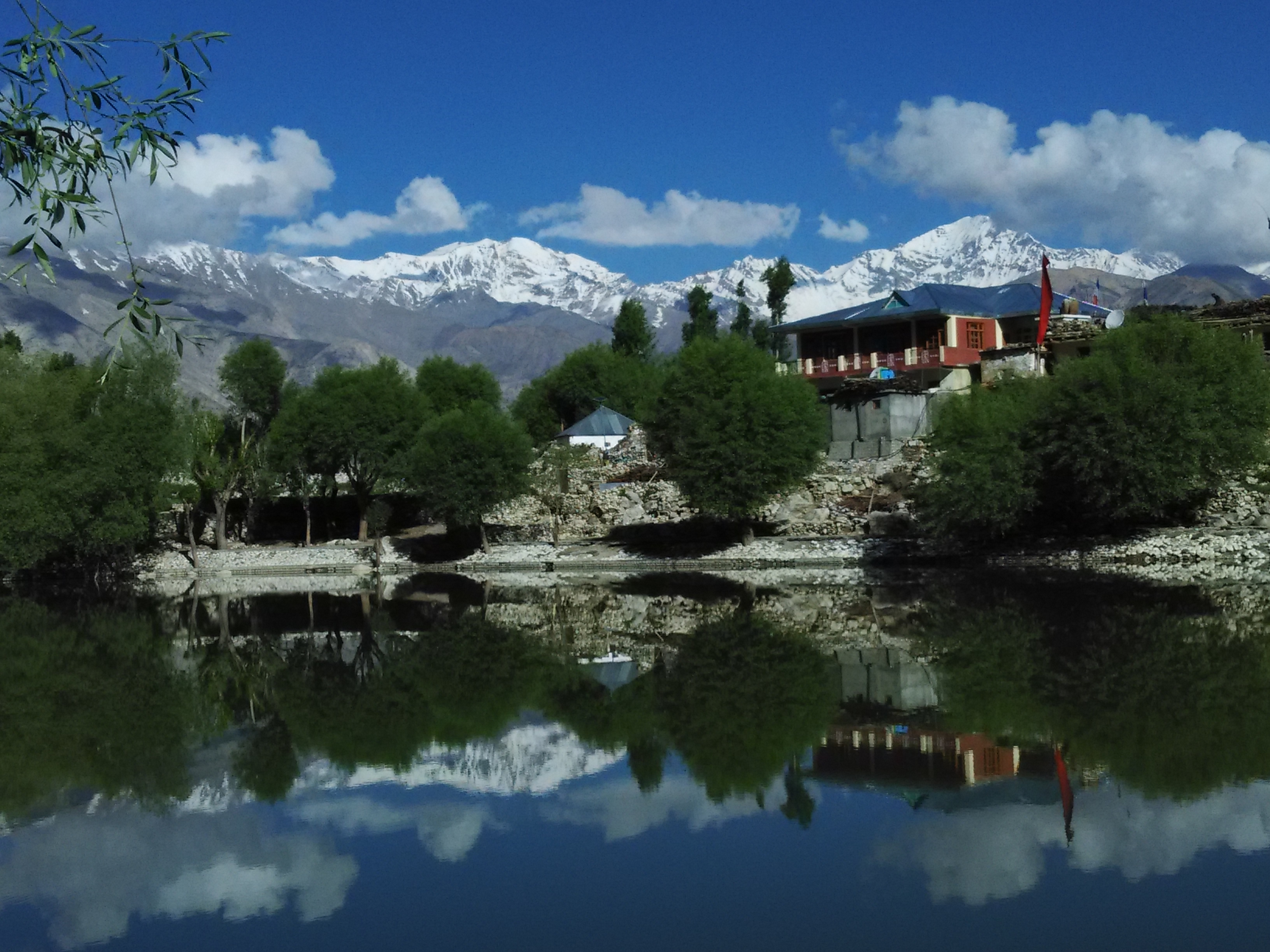
Reflection of Indian Himalayan Peaks on Nako Lake Himachal Pradesh India
