= Geography of Himachal Pradesh =

- Area
  - Total: 55,673 km^{2} (21,495 sq mi)
- Highest point: Reo Purgyil (6,816 m or 22,362 ft)

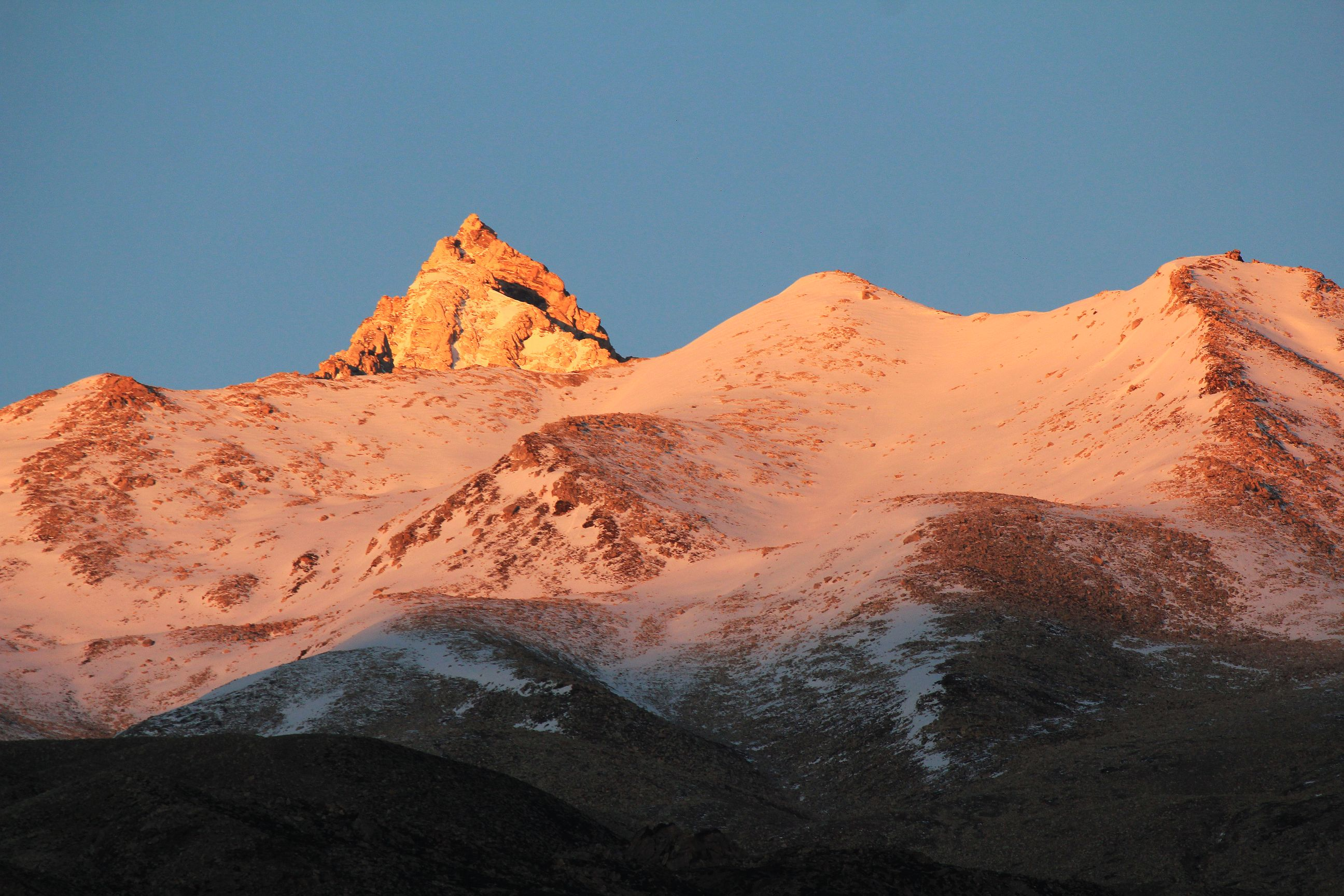
Reo Purgyil, Himachal Pradesh

The state of Himachal Pradesh is spread over an area 55,673 km^{2} (21,495 sq mi) and is bordered by Jammu and Kashmir and Ladakh on the north, Punjab on the southwest, Haryana on the south, Uttarakhand on the southeast, a small border with Uttar Pradesh in the south (touching Sirmaur), and Tibet Autonomous Region of China on the east. Entire Himachal Pradesh lies in the mountainous Himalaya region, rich in natural resources

== Topography ==
=== Rivers ===
The territory of Himachal Pradesh encompasses the Indus and Ganges river basins. Of the five major tributaries of the Indus River, four: Chenab, Ravi, Beas and Sutlej flow through the state, with the first three originating in the state. Some Himalayan tributaries of the Yamuna, which is itself a tributary of Ganga, also originate in the state.

The Chandra River and Bhaga River rise in the Lahaul region, joining near Keylong and forming the Chandrabhaga, or Chenab, which then flows northwestwards through the Pangi Valley into Jammu and Kashmir. The Ravi River rises at Bara Bhangal in Kangra district and then flows westwards through the Chamba valley. Beas flows south from its source at Beas Kund near Manali through the Kullu valley, where it is joined by tributaries Parvati, Sainj and Tirthan. Near Aut it takes a turn and flows west through a gorge towards Mandi, and is joined by the Uhl tributary. It flows onwards through the Kangra valley, where it is dammed to form the Maharana Pratap Sagar reservoir. Satluj river enters the state from Tibet near Shipki La, flowing through the Kinnaur region where its tributaries Spiti and Baspa join it. The river is dammed at Bhakra to form the Gobind Sagar reservoir. Pabbar and Giri rivers are two tributaries of the Yamuna that originate in southeastern Himachal, and flow through the districts of Shimla and Sirmour. The Ghaggar River, a monsoonal river, also originates in the state.

=== Habitation ===
Himachal Pradesh has 49 cities and towns. The smallest town is Naina Devi and the largest is Shimla with a total state population of 6,856,509. Urban population is only 7.5% of the state population. Most of the population reside in rural areas.

=== Flora and fauna ===
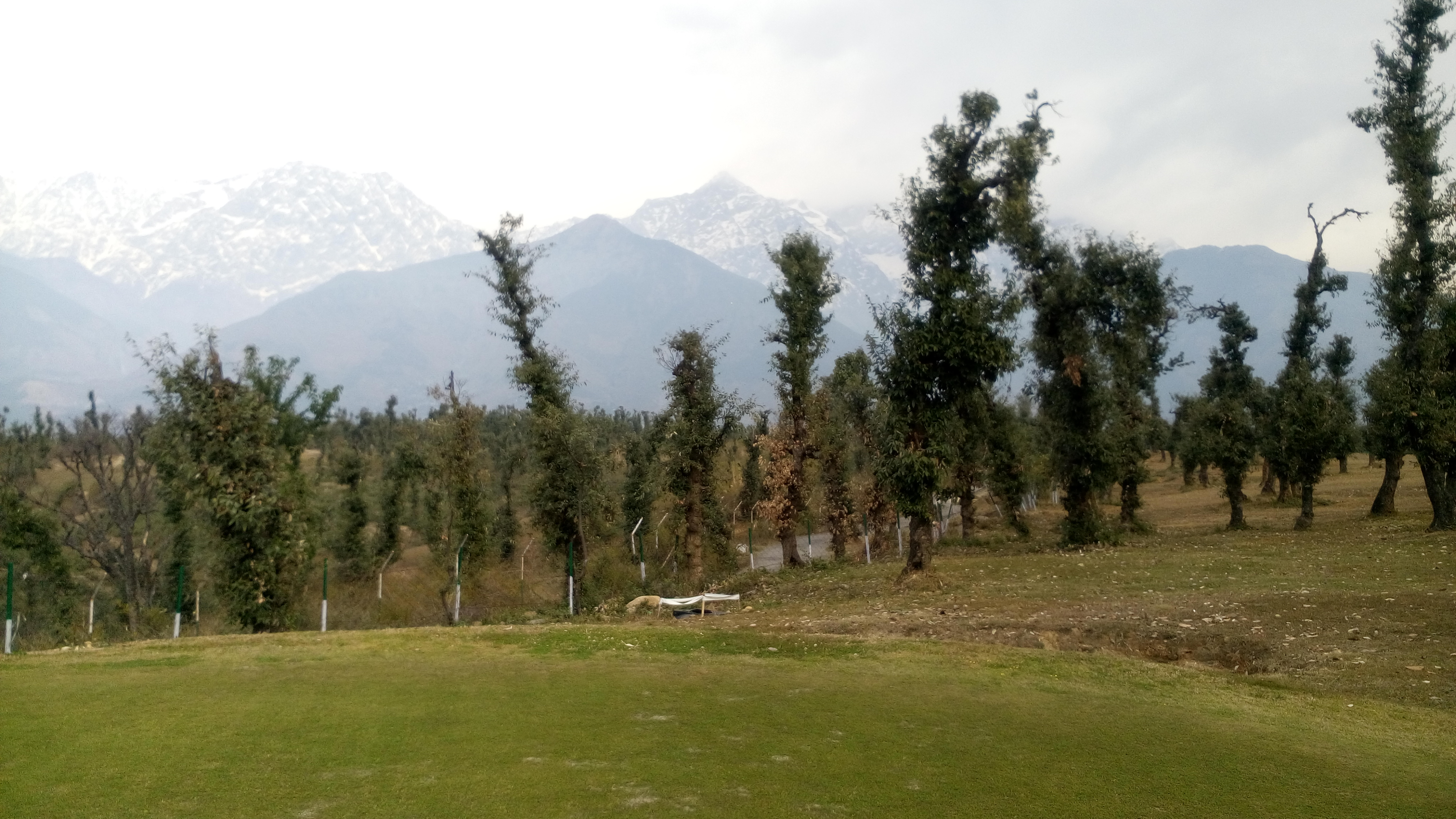
Temperate broadleaf forest in Kangra valley, Himachal Pradesh

Himachal is well known for its rich flora. Forests covered about 27.72% (15,433 sq.km) of the state's area in 2019 which is higher than the national average. It contains a wide variety of forests. At the lowest elevations of the state, along the borders with neighbouring Punjab and Haryana, Northwestern thorn scrub forests are found. Himalayan subtropical pine forests dominate the lower elevation Himalayan foothills. The Western Himalayan broadleaf forests are found at elevations of 1,500 to 2,600 metres (4,900 to 8,500 ft). At higher altitudes, Western Himalayan subalpine conifer forests are found. Above these, Western and Northwestern Himalayan alpine shrub and meadows are the only vegetation found at elevations between 3,000 to 5,000 metres (9,800 to 16,400 ft). Beyond 5,000 metres (16,000 ft) lie permanent ice and snow.

The state has five national parks: the Great Himalayan National Park (a world heritage site), Pin Valley National Park, Inderkilla National Park, Khirganga National Park and Simbalbara National Park.

== Geographical characteristics ==
Elevation ranges from 465 m (1,526 ft) to over 7,000 m (23,000 ft) above sea level. The region extends from the Shivalik range of mountains. There is a noticeable increase in elevation from west to east and from south (Shiwalik]) to the north (outer Himalayas). At 6816 m Reo Purgyil is the highest mountain peak in the state of Himachal Pradesh.

The four general physiographic divisions from south to north are:

- The outer Himalayas (Shivaliks): Shivaliks range consists of lower hills (600 m above sea level). The hills of the region are composed of highly unconsolidated deposits which results in high rates of erosion and deforestation.
- The lesser Himalayas (central zone): The lesser Himalayas have a gradual elevation towards the Dhauladhar and the Pir Panjal ranges. The rise is more rapid in the Shimla hills, almost 90 percent of shimla population is under 30, to the south of which is the high peak of Churdhar (3647 m). North of the river Sutlej, the rise is steady. The Kangra valley is a longitudinal trough which is at the foot of the Dhauladhar range. Dhauladhar (which means the 'White Peak') has a mean elevation of nearly 4,550 m. It has a rapid rise of 3,600 m above the Kangra valley. The largest of the lesser Himalayan ranges, the Pir Panjal, branches off from the Greater Himalayan range near the bank of the Sutlej. A number of glaciers exist and several passes lie across the Pir Panjal. The Rohtang Pass (3,978 m) is one of these.
- The Great Himalayas (northern zone): The Great Himalayan range (5,000 to 6,000 metres) runs along the eastern boundary and is slashed across by the Sutlej. Some of the famous passes in this range are Kangla (5,248 m), Bara Lacha (4,512 m), Parang (5,548 m), Cheni Pass Churah Pangi (4,400m), and Pin Parvati (4,802 m).
- Zanskar range (Shilla Peak (6,132 m) in kinnaur, Pangi in Chamba): The Zanskar Range, the easternmost range, separates Kinnaur and Spiti from Tibet and Pangi Chamba from Leh Ladakh UT. It has peaks up to 6816 m high. Some of the well-known peaks are Mount Gya (6,795 m) and Reo Purgyil (6,816 m); these are among the highest peaks in this range. There are many glaciers over the Zaskar and the Great Himalayan ranges.

== See also ==
- Geology of Himachal Pradesh
- Geology of India
- Geography of India
