= List of districts of Himachal Pradesh by highest point =

This is a list of districts of Himachal Pradesh by highest point.

== Districts ==
District	Highest Peak	Height (m)
Kinnaur	Reo Purgyil	6,816
Lahaul and Spiti	Gya	6,794
Kullu	Parvati Parbat	6,632
Chamba	Menthosa	6,443
Kangra	Shikar Beh	6,200
Shimla	Pishu	5,672
Mandi	Nagru	4,050
Sirmaur	Churdhar	3,647
Solan	Mount Karol	2,280
Bilaspur	Bahadurpur	1,980
Hamirpur	Awah Devi	1,247
Una	Sola singhi fort 1200	1,200
