= Tashigang, Himachal Pradesh =

Tashigang
- Village
- Location in Himachal Pradesh, India
- Coordinates: 31.84010°N 78.69669°E
- Country: India
- State: Himachal Pradesh
- District: Kinnaur

Languages
  - Official: Hindi
  - Local: Spiti
- Time zone: UTC+5:30 (IST)
- Vehicle registration: HP-27

Tashigang is a village near an ancient monastery in the state of Himachal Pradesh, India, at a staggering altitude of 15,256 feet above msl. It is a settlement in Kinnaur and is located in the Sutlej river valley near the India-Tibet border. National Highway 5 connects Khab with state capital Shimla. Below Tashigang flows the Sutlej river, which originates from Mansarovar Lake in Tibet. The villages of Nako and Khab are nearby. Current Tashigang is controlled by India but claimed by Zanda County, Ngari Prefecture, Tibet, China. You can go to the mountain Gang Chua via Tashigang through a pass.

== Claims ==
According to some maps, the territory is disputed between India and China, while in others it is not.

== Transportation ==
Tashigang can be reached by foot from Nako and Khab.

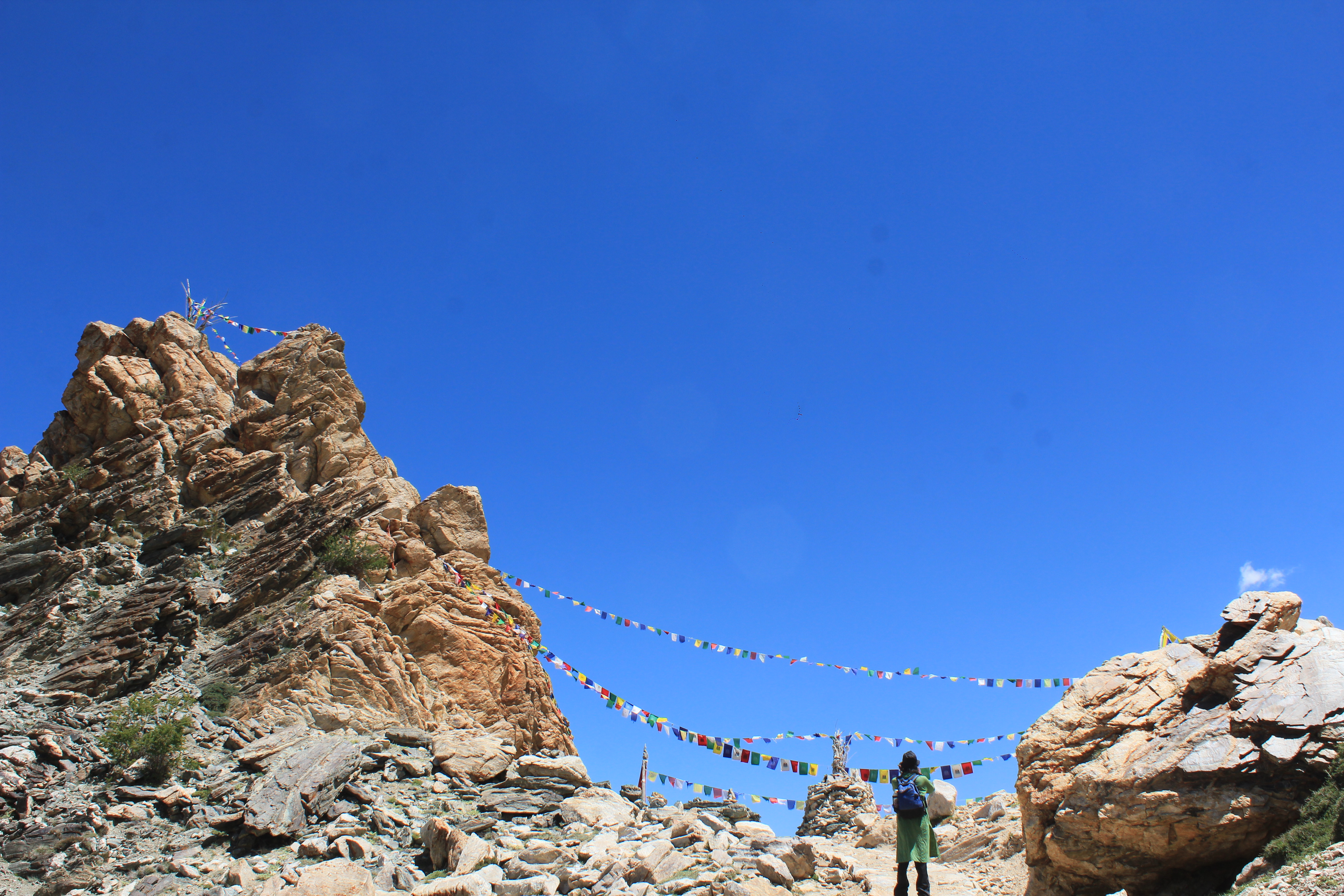
Pass on the way to Tashigang from Nako.

== See also ==
- Shipki La
- India-China Border Roads
- Line of Actual Control
- List of disputed territories of India
