= Nako, Himachal Pradesh =

Nako
- Village
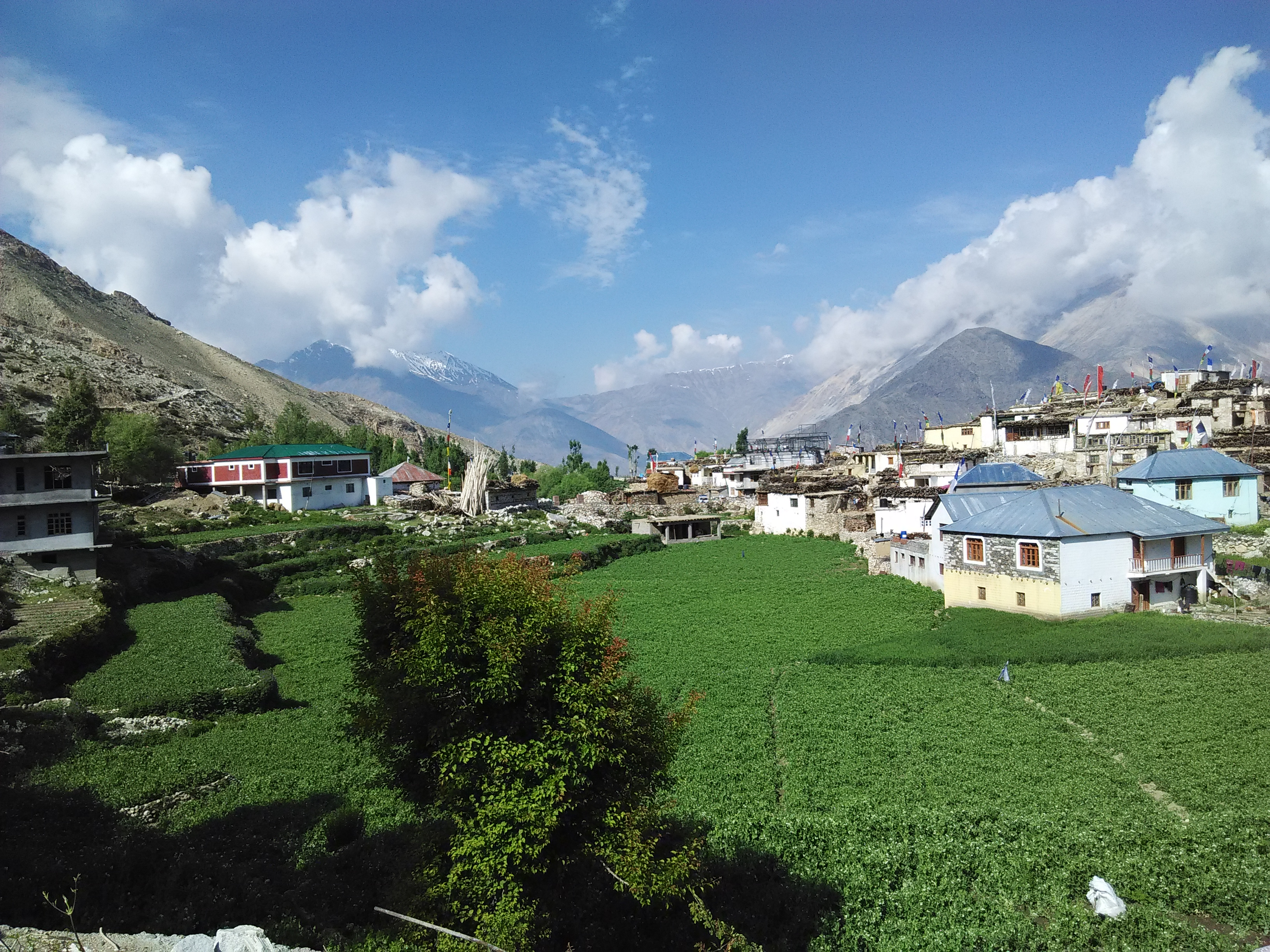
- Nako village

- Location in India
- Coordinates: 31°52′53.47″N 78°37′38.87″E
- Country: India
- State: Himachal Pradesh
- District: Kinnaur
- Elevation: 11,893 ft (3,625 m)

Languages
  - Official: Hindi
  - Native: Bhoti Kinnauri
- Time zone: UTC+5:30 (IST)
- Postal code: 172111
- Website: https://hpkinnaur.nic.in

Nako in Spiti river valley is a village in the Himalayas of northern India, located close to the India-China border in the Trans-Himalayan region of Kinnaur district in Himachal Pradesh. Nako Lake is a prominent feature here where it borders the village. Nako Monastery, dated to 1025 AD, is located in the village as well as several other Buddhist chortens. Nako Monastery in the upper part of the village and the Nako Lake are important landmarks in the village.

== History ==
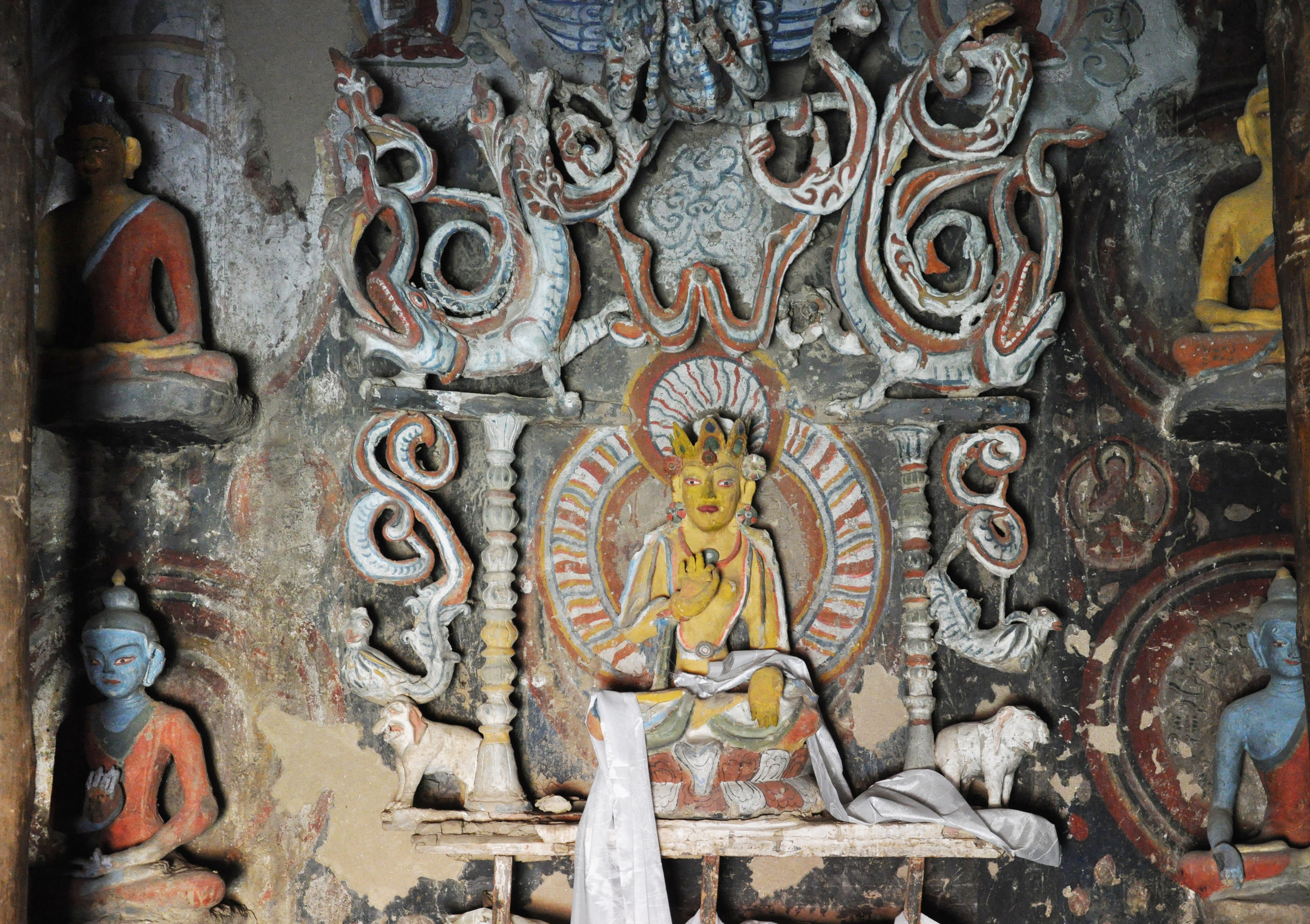
Idols of Five Dhyani Budhhas of Nako Monastery

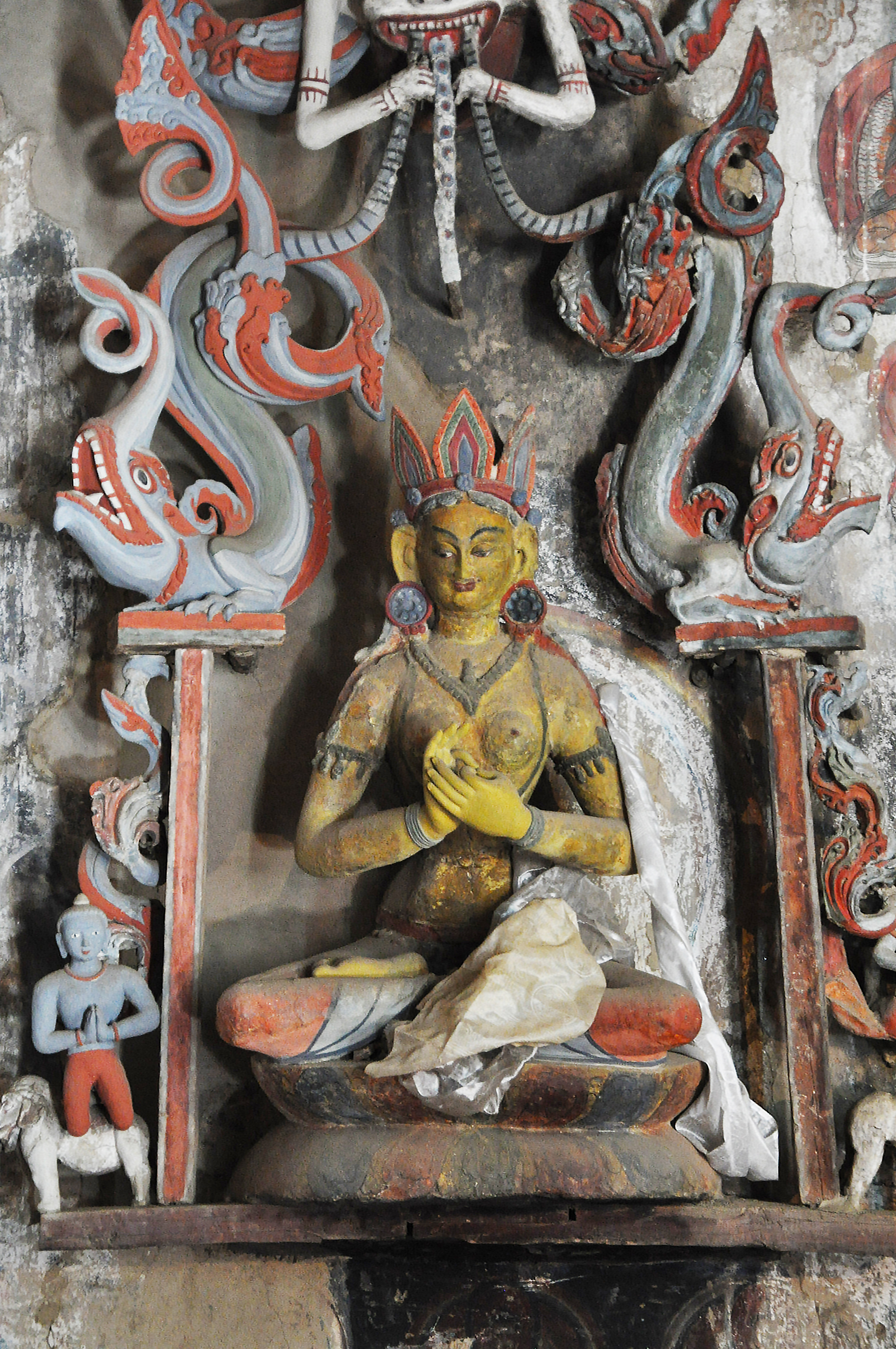
Yellow Tara Idol at Nako Monastery.

One of the earliest descriptions of Nako is by the botanist Thomas Thomson based on his expedition in August 1847. He reported that Nako was smaller than Leo. He and his team were accommodated in apartments in the Buddhist monastery. There was an abundance of water and extensive cultivation, a copse of poplars and willows, but no fruit trees.

== Geography ==
Nako is the largest village in the Hangrang Valley at an elevation of 3,625 metres (11,893 ft) (3,662 metres (12,014 ft) is also mentioned). The extent of the village is 282.2 ha (697 acres). It is set against the scenic backdrop of Reo Purgyal which has an elevation of 6,816 metres (22,362 ft) and is the highest mountain in Himachal Pradesh. The village is now on a more stable location near the Nako Lake which is formed by the slopes of the mountains of Reo Purgyal. Earlier, it was in a location on the opposite bank of the Nako river where it was subject to tectonic upliftment.

== Demographics ==
As of 2011, the village had a population of 572 with 128 households. Females comprised 52.1% and males 47.9%. The majority, 93%, of the population belong to Scheduled Tribes, while only 2.6% are Scheduled Castes.

The languages spoken are Bhoti Kinnauri and Hindi. Nako has a gram panchayat.

== Economy ==
Tourism and agriculture are two mainstay of economy of Nako.

Regarding agriculture, in 1947 the botanist Thomson reported that the predominant crop was barley. The barley was ripe and being harvested when he visited in August. Near Nako, he found a series of irrigation ponds that were fed by a conduit from a stream more than 1 mi (1.6 km) distant. In modern times, apples and sun-dried apricots are agricultural produce of the village.

== Tourism ==
Nako, a base for trekking, has tourist hotels, homestays, restaurants, lake, gompa, a hospital, dispensary, veterinary hospital, and schools from pre-primary up to secondary level. It is served by an India Post Branch Post Office with PIN code 172111.

=== Nako monastery ===
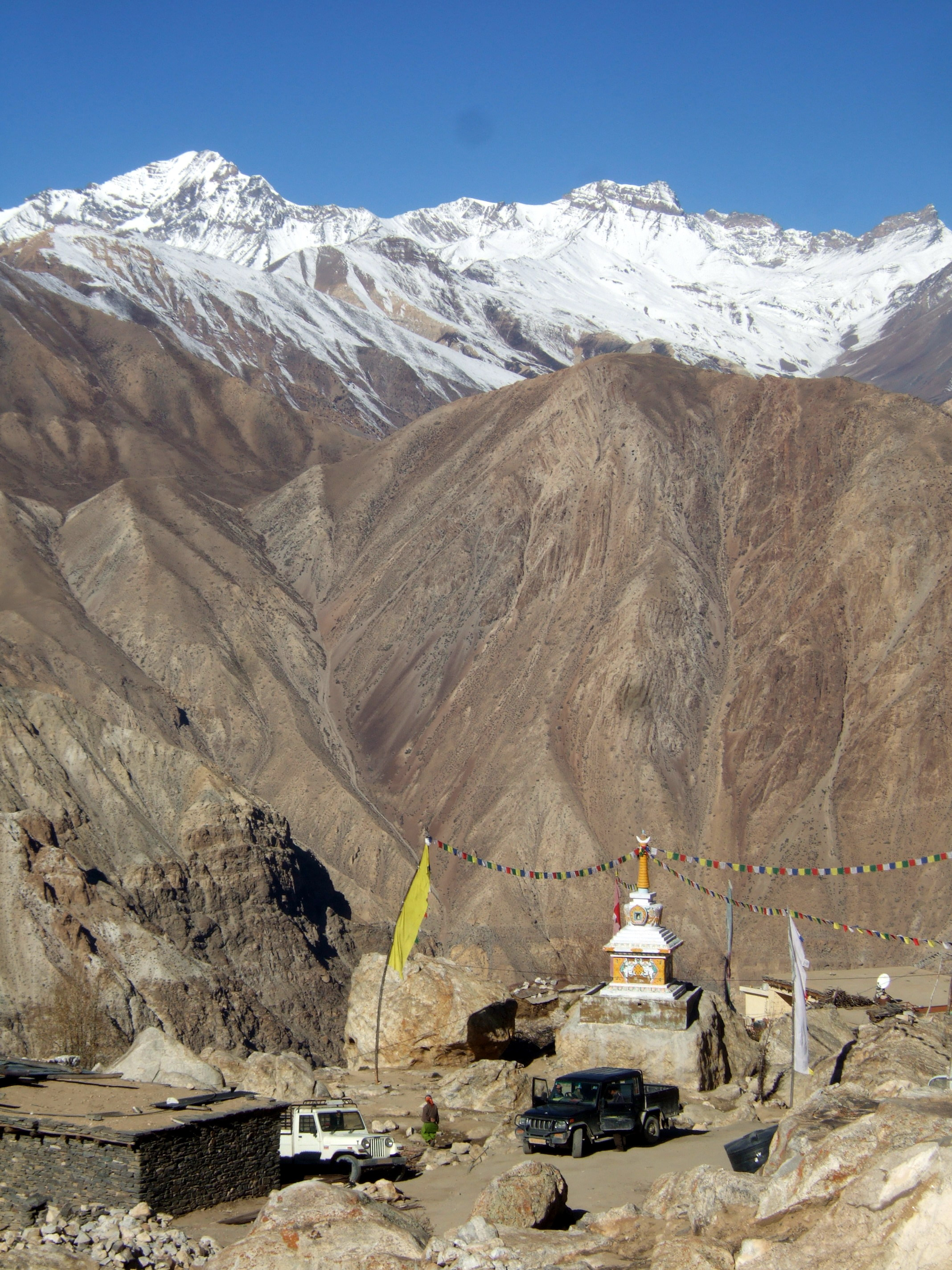
Nako Monastery

Nako monastery (Tibetan language:Lob-dpon-zhabrjes) dated to the 11th century (1025 AD), oriented towards Tibet, similar in style to the Tabo Monastery consists of four large halls of which the oldest and largest is known as Dukhong. It is also known as 'Lotsava Jhakang' meaning "complex of the translator" named so in honour of Rinchen Zangpo who translated Buddhist scriptures from Sanskrit to the Tibetan language. The iconographic art work in the monastery is related to Vajrayana Buddhism. The dukhong's walls have decorations of a complete mandala with "gates, fire-circle and secondary non-Buddhist deities in attendance". To the east of this dukhong there is another hall of smaller size which has a sculpture of Yellow Tara (known as Grolgster) made in stucco, with its roof and walls painted with mandalas. In the third hall there is an elegant image of Vairochana. Within the complex there is a shrine dedicated to Purgyal, a local deity with attribution as the "spirit of the mountain". Sculptures of five Dhyani Buddhas made out of clay are defied in the main hall where there are also many images.

In the earthquake of 1975 the buildings were affected. Many bright artworks in the monastery were vandalized. During this earthquake event roofs of the monastery and other buildings in the village were damaged. Further, during the severe winter season of 1998 the monastery was in near collapse stage. Following these disastrous events, in May 1998, the University of Vienna launched a research Project in association with the Indian National Trust for Art and Cultural Heritage (INTACH), the Buddhist Association of Nako, and local residents of Nako to carry out restoration works. In July 2002, the Nako Preservation Project (NPP) came to be established for conservation of the monastery and other buildings in Nako.

=== Nako lake ===
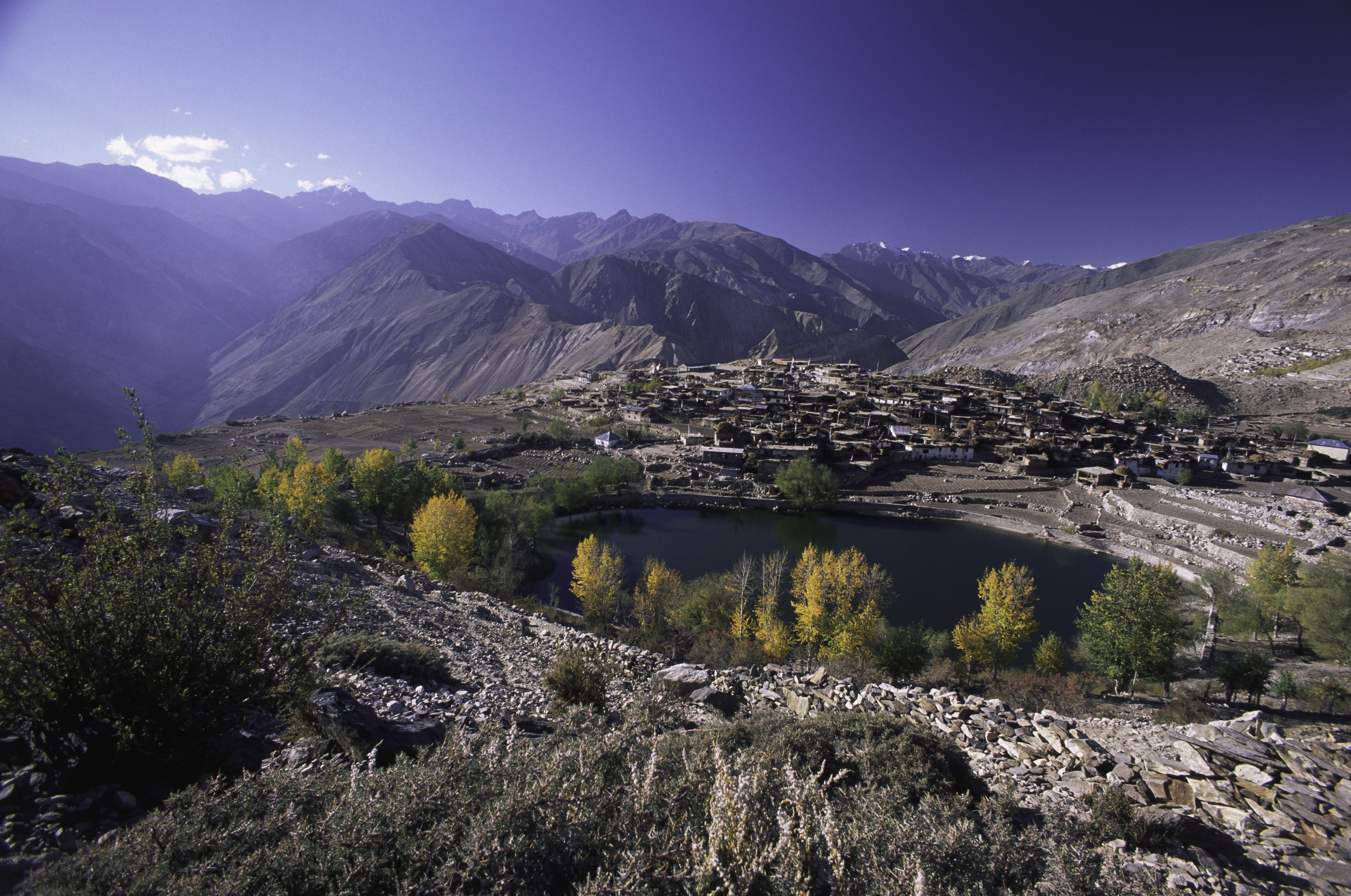
Nako Lake with the monastery and the village in the background.

Nako Lake, a small lake at elevation 3,636 metres (11,929 ft) in the Kinnaur district, is 103 kilometres (64 mi) away from the district headquarter town of Reckong Peo. The lake is an integral part of the Nako village, which is created on the slopes of the Reo Purgyal mountain of the Srikhand range. During the evening twilight hours a very large number of birds flock the lake. There is a rock here which is believed to have the foot print of Padmasambhava, recording his visit to the area. A shrine has been built around this foot print and there is also stucco statue of Padmasambhava above it in addition to murals. The periphery of the lake has plantations of willow and poplar trees. The lake has boating facilities during the summer months and ice skating is practiced on the lake's surface which gets frozen during the winter months.

=== Chango gompa ===
Chango gompa, a few km away from the Nako monastery on the road from Spiti, has a prayer wheel more than 500 years old, which measures about 3.5 m (11 ft) in diameter. It is made of yak skin.

=== Trekking trails ===
There are numerous trekking trails from Nako leading to Chango, Hango and Tashigang villages, Reckong Peo in Satluj valley, Reo Purgyal mountain range, etc. A 6-day Nako-Hango-Reckong Peo trek, after a steep climb to the Hango Pass, trail descends to Leo (Liyo) on the south bank of the Spiti River where it crosses the river and climbs up to Nako.

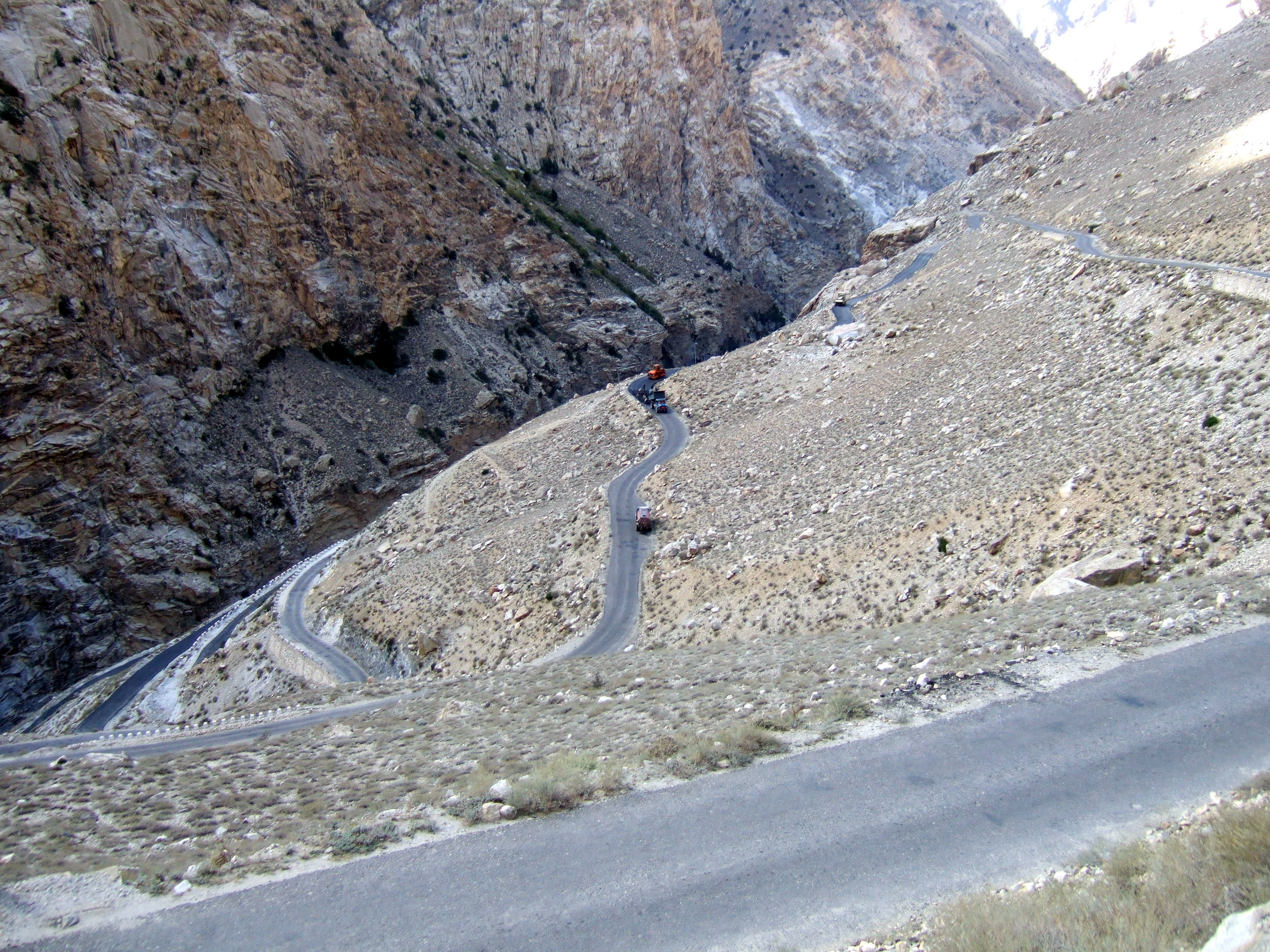
Road branching from NH505 to Nako.

== Transport ==
Access to the village is from a branch road of 7 kilometres (4.3 mi) from the NH-505. It is 117 kilometres (73 mi) away from Kalpa.

== See also ==
- Geography of Himachal Pradesh
- Tourism in Himachal Pradesh
- Tourism in India

== Bibliography ==
- Ahluwalia, Manjit Singh (1 January 1998). Social, Cultural, and Economic History of Himachal Pradesh. Indus Publishing. ISBN 978-81-7387-089-7.
- Mitra, Swati (1 January 2006). The Buddhist Trail in Himachal: A Travel Guide. Good Earth. ISBN 978-81-87780-33-5.
- Singh, Ajay Kumar (1985). Trans-Himalayan Wall Paintings: 10th to 13th Century A.D. Agam Kala Prakashan.
