= Khab =

- village
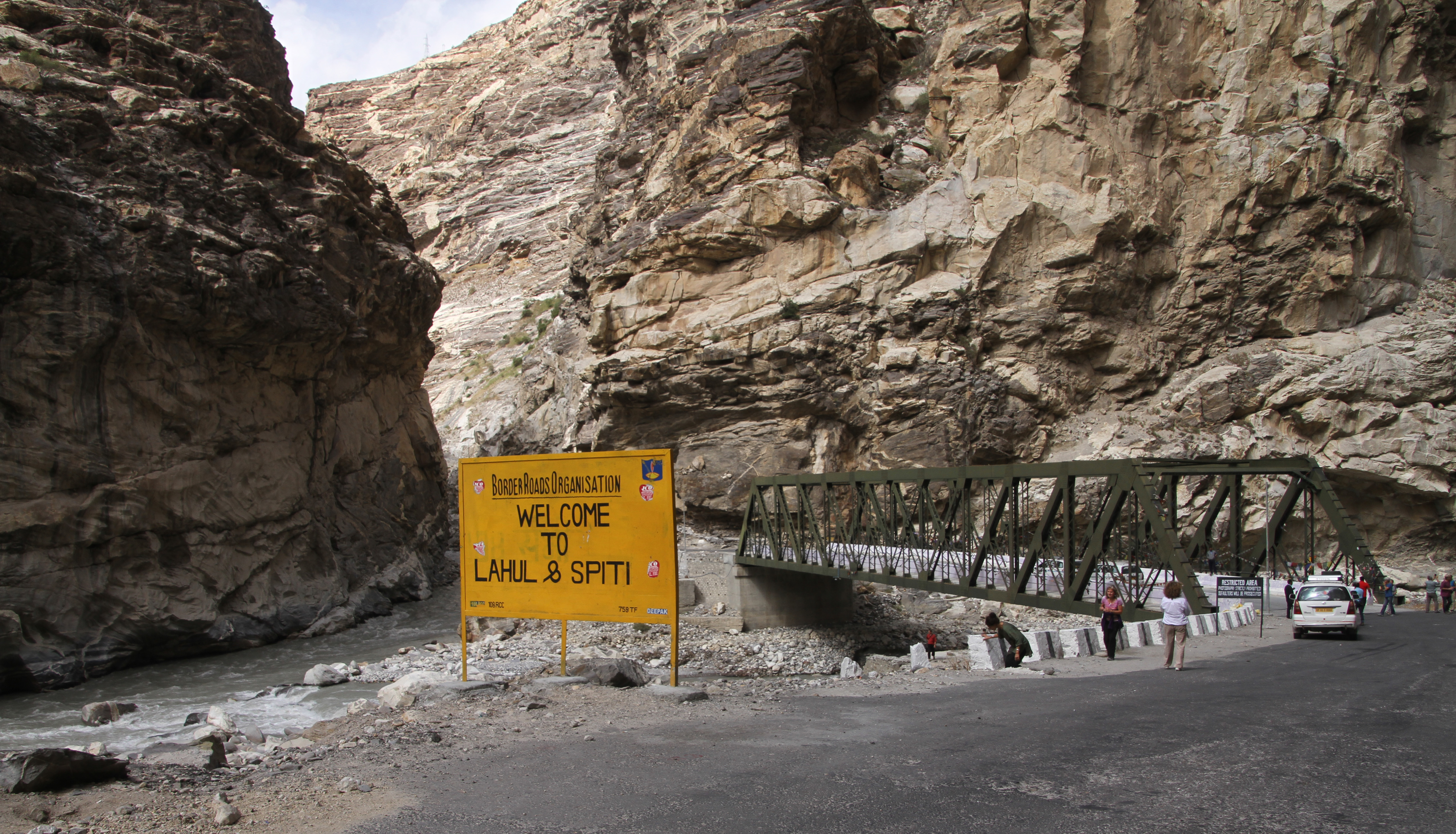
- Confluence of Satluj and Spiti at Khab

- Location in Himachal Pradesh, India Khab (India)
- Coordinates: 31°47′59″N 78°38′38″E
- Country: India
- State: Himachal Pradesh
- District: Kinnaur
- Elevation: 2,438 m (7,999 ft)

Languages
  - Official: Hindi
- Time zone: UTC+5:30 (IST)
- Vehicle registration: HP

Khab is a small village in the state of Himachal Pradesh, India. It is located in the Sutlej river valley near the India-Tibet border. National Highway 5 connects Khab with state capital Shimla. Khab sangam is the confluence of Spiti river and Sutlej river. The Spiti river flowing through the spiti valley here meets the Sutlej, which originates from Mansarovar Lake in Tibet. The ancient monastery of Tashigang Gompa is nearby. The peak of Reo Purgil, which rises to 22,400 feet (6,800 m), is visible and the cold desert of Spiti lies across the nearby bridge.

== Connectivity ==
Khab is connected by road with National Highway 5 from state capital Shimla. National Highway 505 starts from Khab and provides connectivity to Spiti valley in Lahaul and Spiti district of Himachal Pradesh.

== See also ==
- Shipki La
