= Liyo, Kinnaur =

Leo Liyo
- village
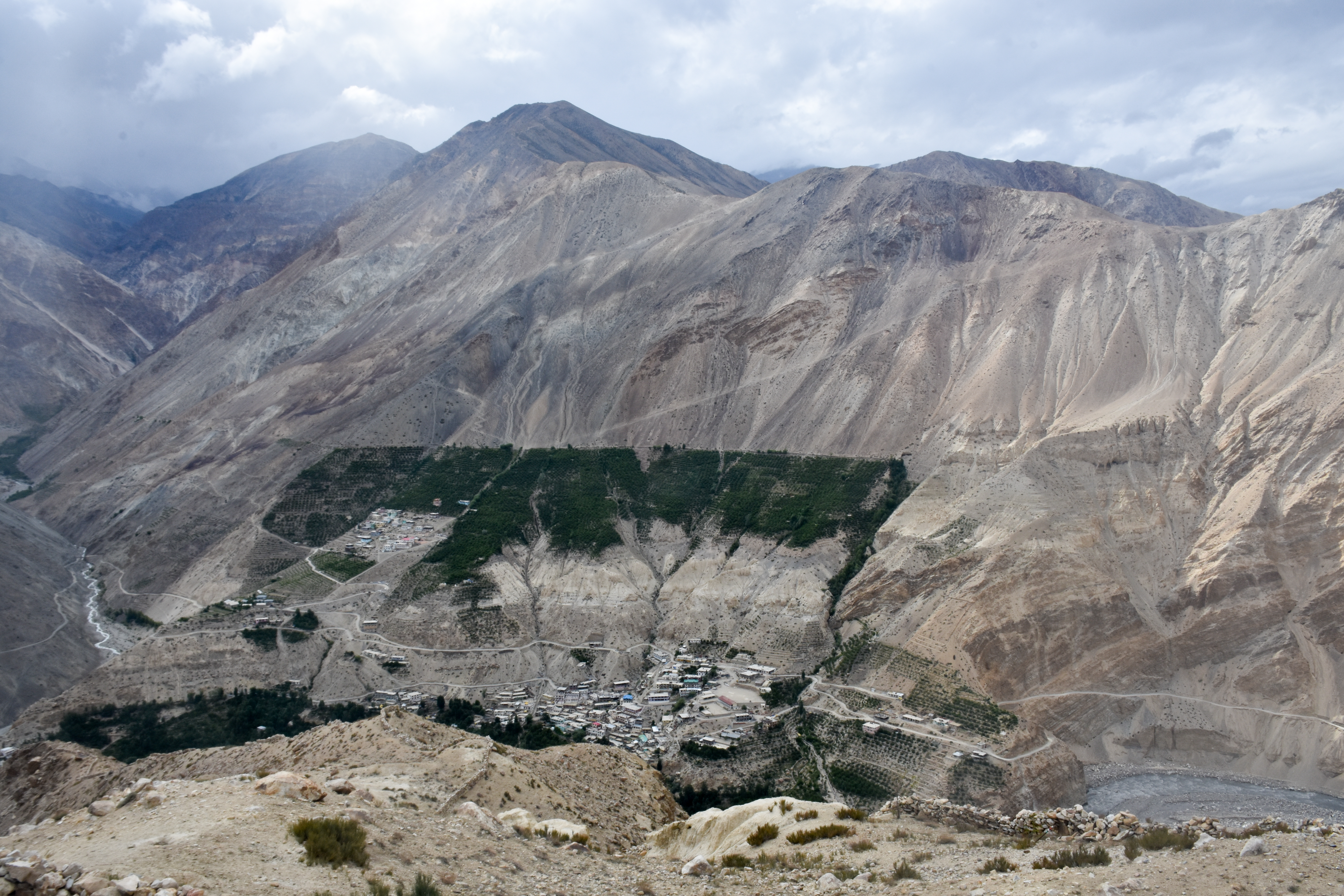
- Leo village, Jun '18

- Location within Himachal Pradesh Location within India
- Coordinates: 31.885326°N 78.595652°E <<< get from OpenStreetMap.org >>>
- Country: India
- State: Himachal Pradesh

Area
  - Total: 2.69 km^{2} (1.04 sq mi)
- Elevation: 2,871 m (9,419 ft)

Population (2011)
  - Total: 784
  - Density: 291/km^{2} (755/sq mi)

Languages
  - Official: Hindi
  - Native: Bhoti Kinnauri
- Time zone: UTC+5:30 (IST)
- Postal code: 172112
- Website: https://hpkinnaur.nic.in

Leo (also Liyo, Hindi: लियो ) is a small village in Kinnaur district, Himachal Pradesh, India. The village is situated on a mountain ridge on the right bank of the Spiti River. It is located 116 kilometres (72 mi) from Kaza on NH 505.

The people of Nako are largely agriculturalists. Leo is popular with trekkers.

== History ==
One of the earliest descriptions of Leo is by the botanist Thomas Thomson based on his expedition in August 1847. He trekked from the Sutlej valley over the Hangaranj Pass, then descended via Hango to Leo (Lio). He found a sizeable village with many terraced fields.

== Geography ==
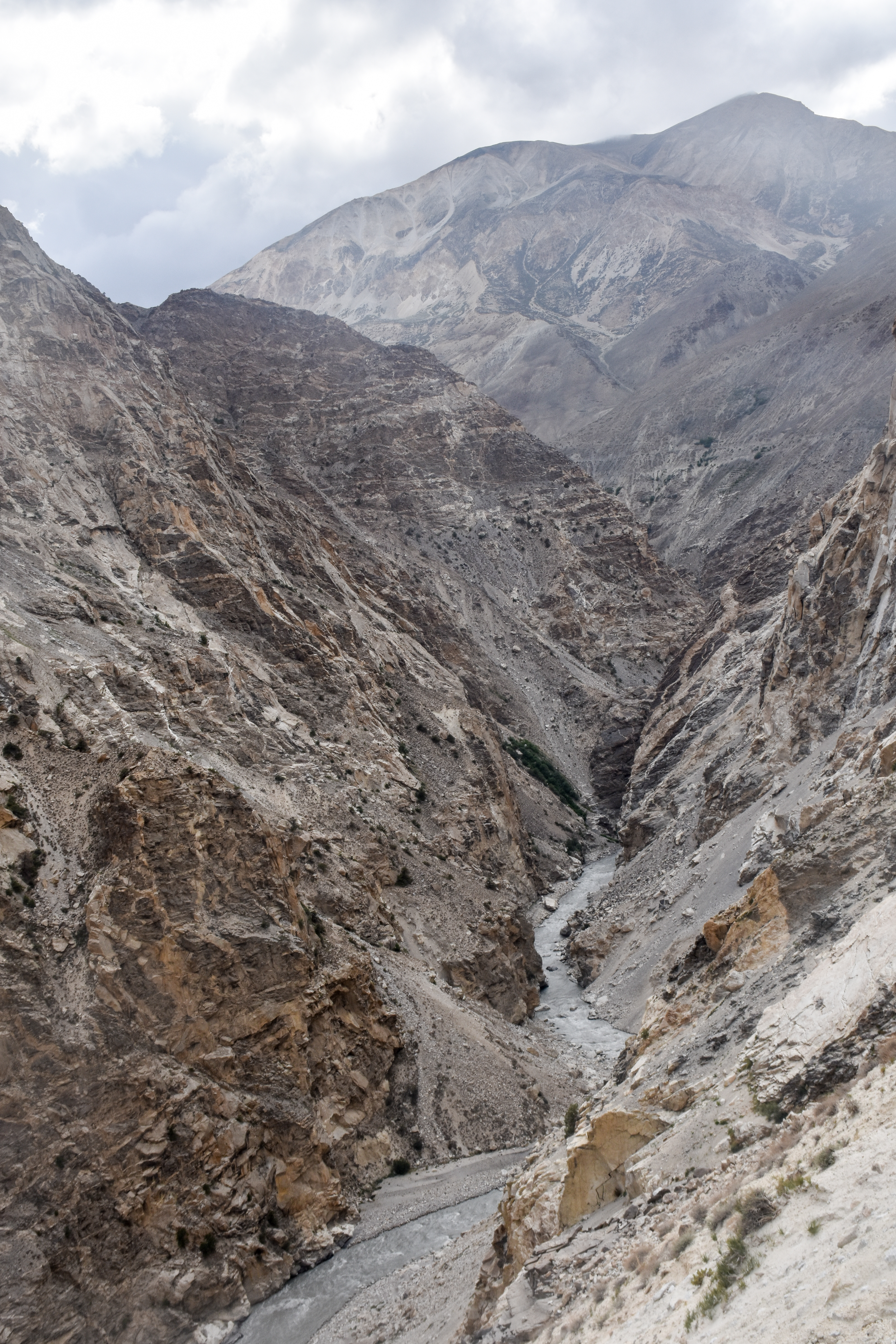
Spiti gorge below Leo

Leo is a small village in Kinnaur District. It is located at a distance of 93 kilometres (58 mi) from the district headquarters Reckong Peo on NH 505. Leo village has an area of 269 hectares (660 acres). Leo is situated on the bank of a small right-bank tributary of the Spiti River. The Spiti River passes through a deep ravine with precipitous mountains on either side. The banks are covered with loose shingle.

== Demographics ==
The population as of the 2011 Census was 784 with 161 households. Females comprise 46.8% of the population. The percentages of Scheduled Castes is 2.0% and of Scheduled Tribes is 87.8%. The literacy rate is 71.6%, with males at 79.9% and females 62.1%.

The languages are Spiti Bhoti and Hindi. The people of Leo are mostly Mongoloid. The main religion followed is Mahayana Buddhism. Leo has a Gram Panchayat.

== Amenities ==
Leo has schools from primary up to senior secondary. The village is served by an India Post Sub-Post Office, with PIN code 172112.

== Economy ==
The economy is largely agrarian. Tourism is also important.

=== Agriculture ===
When the botanist Thomson visited Leo (Lio) in August 1847, he found a sizeable village with many terraced fields. Crops grown included wheat, barley, buckwheat and millet. The fields had many apricot trees interspersed with the crops. Thomson speculated that agriculture flourished due to good heat due to reflection from surrounding mountains. He expressed surprised at the complete absence of trees despite the altitude being below the tree line.

Traditionally, up to 1980, five crops were important in Spiti valley, namely black pea, potato, barley (hull-less and covered) and wheat. A study done in 2007–2009, found that by 1990, farmers had diversified to 9 crops. One of the new crops, green peas, covered about 47% of the survey area by 2000. Some of the main reasons for adoption of new crops include better road connectivity and transport to reach markets, declining demand for traditional crops, and availability of hybrid seeds and favourable micro-climatic niches.

=== Tourism ===
Leo is located in Kinnaur in the northeast corner of Himachal Pradesh. Bordered by Tibet to the east, Kinnaur is a district having three high mountains ranges i.e. Zanskar, Greater Himalayas and Dhauladhar, and the enclosing valleys of the rivers Sutlej, Spiti, Baspa and their tributaries. The slopes are covered with thick woods, orchards, fields and picturesque hamlets. The much-revered religious Shivlinga lies at the peak of the Kinnaur Kailash mountain.

A popular trek passing through Leo is from Reckong Peo in the Satluj valley to Nako in the Spiti valley. The trek takes 6 days. After a steep climb to the Hango Pass, the trail descends to Leo (Liyo) on the south bank of the Spiti. There, the trail crosses the Spiti river and climbs up to Nako.

== Transport ==
Buses ply from Shimla on NH 5 and NH 505 to Kaza in Spiti via Nako. From Nako, taxis are available to Leo.

== See also ==
- Nako, Himachal Pradesh
- Spiti Valley
