= Reo Purgyil =

Himalayan mountain

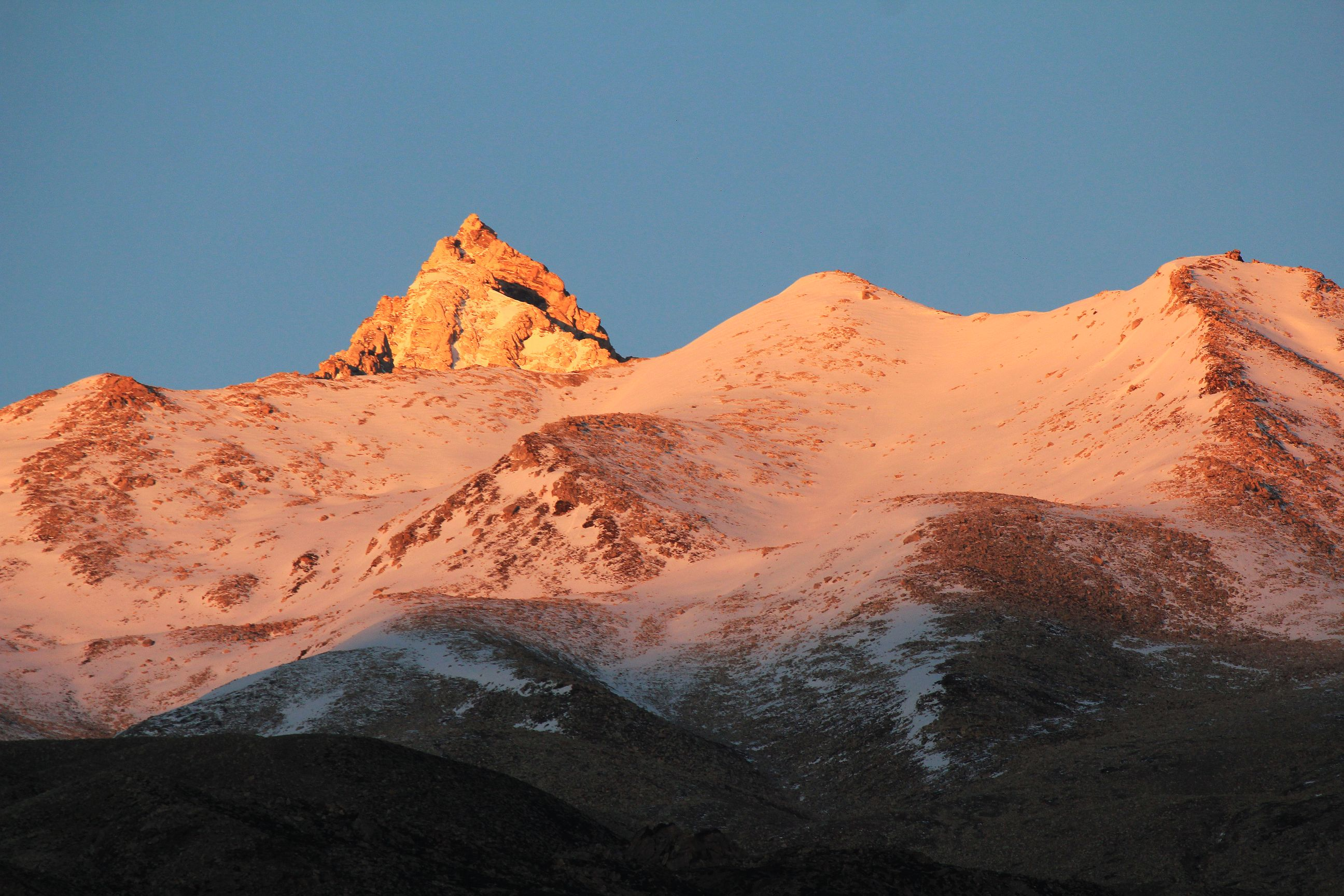
- View of the peak

Highest point
- Elevation: 6,816 m (22,362 ft)
- Prominence: 1,978 m (6,490 ft)
- Listing: Indian state high point Ultra
- Coordinates: 31°53′02″N 78°43′53″E

Geography
- Location within Ngari Location within Himachal Pradesh
- Location: Pooh tehsil, Kinnaur district, Himachal Pradesh, India; Zanda County, Ngari Prefecture, Tibet Autonomous Region, China
- Parent range: Western Himalaya

Climbing
- First ascent: 1971
- Easiest route: Climb

Reo Purgyil (6,816 m), and its shorter twin known as Leo Pargial or Leo Pargil (6,791 m), are twin mountain peaks at the southern end of the Zanskar Range in the Western Himalaya located on the border between Himachal Pradesh, India and Tibet, China.

Reo Purgyil is the highest mountain peak in the state of Himachal Pradesh. This dome shaped peak, often obscured by clouds, is part of a great massif that rises above the Sutlej river and overlooks the western valleys of Tibet. The Spiti River, a right bank tributary of the Satluj, drains the northern face of the massif.

Leo Pargial, a well-known slightly shorter twin of Reo Purgyil, is located about 2 km north of Reo Purgyil.

NH-505 passes by the nearby Nako village located on the slopes of the Reo Purgyil mountain, close to the India-Tibet border.

== Climbing history ==
- Reo Purgyil
  - 1st official ascent (1971) by ITBP (Indo Tibetan Border Police)
  - 2nd ascent (1991) by E. Theophilus and team
  - 2018 ascent by Rajsekhar Maity and a Bengali team
- Leo Pargial
  - Greek-British author and mountaineer, Marco Alexander Pallis, famous for his writings on Tibetan Buddhism, made the first documented ascent of Leo Pargial peak (6790m) in 1933.
  - 2020 ascent by 12 members of ITBP led by Deputy Commandant Kuldeep Singh and the Deputy Leader was Deputy Commandant Dhramender Thakur. Reportedly the only successful mountaineering expedition in North India during the COVID-19 pandemic

== Tourism ==
Nako, base for the trekking, also has tourist hotels, homestays, restaurants, a lake, Buddhist Gompa.

== Transport ==
NH-505 passes through the nearby Nako.

== See also ==
- Geography of Himachal Pradesh
- List of peaks in Himachal Pradesh
- List of mountains in India
- List of mountains by elevation
