= Shipki La =

Mountain pass in India and Tibet

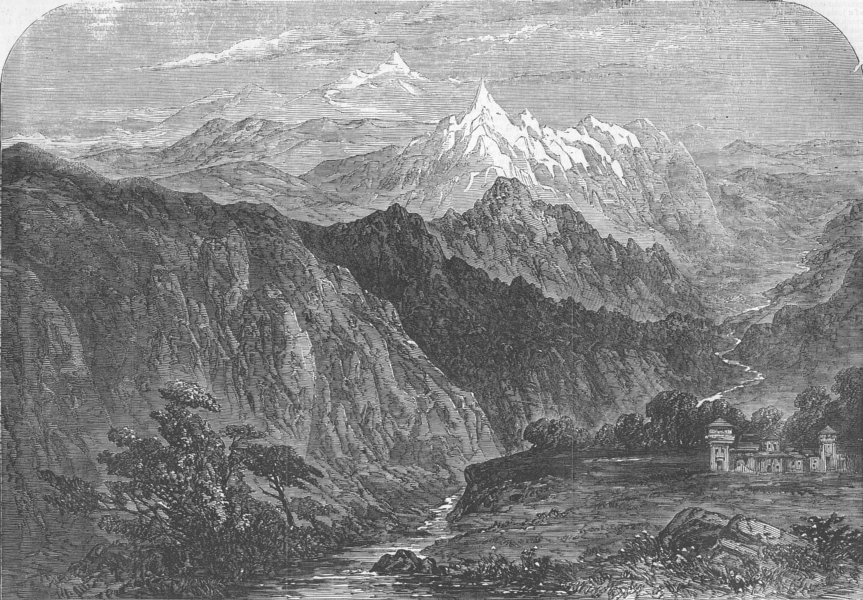
- Illustration depicting Sutlej river at Shipki La, ca. 1856

- Location within Himachal Pradesh Location within Tibet
- Elevation: 3,930 m (12,890 ft)
- Traversed by: India National Highway NH5

Third Approach
- Location: Himachal Pradesh, India – Tibet, China
- Range: Himalayas
- Coordinates: 31°49′55″N 78°44′02″E

Shipki La
- Simplified Chinese: 什布奇山口
- Traditional Chinese: 什布奇山口
Transcriptions

Shipki La is a mountain pass and border post with a dozen buildings of significant size on the Indo-China border. The river Sutlej, which is called Langqên Zangbo in Tibet, enters India (from China) near this pass. A spur road on the Indian side rises to an altitude of 4,720 metres (15,490 ft) four km southwest of Shipki La.

The pass is on the border between the Kinnaur district in the state of Himachal Pradesh, India, and the Ngari Prefecture in Tibet, China. The pass is one of India's border trading points with Tibet along with Nathu La in Sikkim, and Lipulekh in Uttarakhand. The pass is close to the town of Khab.

Currently the road at the pass is used only for small-scale local trade across the border. Historically, trade through Shipki La was closely connected with the commercial networks of the Sutlej Valley and Bushahr State. One of the most important trade events associated with this trans-Himalayan exchange was the annual Lavi Fair held at Rampur Bushahr in November. Traders from Tibet, Kinnaur and the surrounding Himalayan regions gathered at the fair to exchange goods such as wool, pashm, salt and other commodities. The term “Lavi” is believed to be derived from the local word 'loi' meaning raw wool, which was among the principal items traded. Although Tibetan traders no longer participate as they did in the past, the fair continues today as an important commercial and cultural event in the region. Like other border passes along the Indo-China border, it is not open for non-residents. Most people travelling between India and Tibet by land travel via Nepal.

== Geography ==
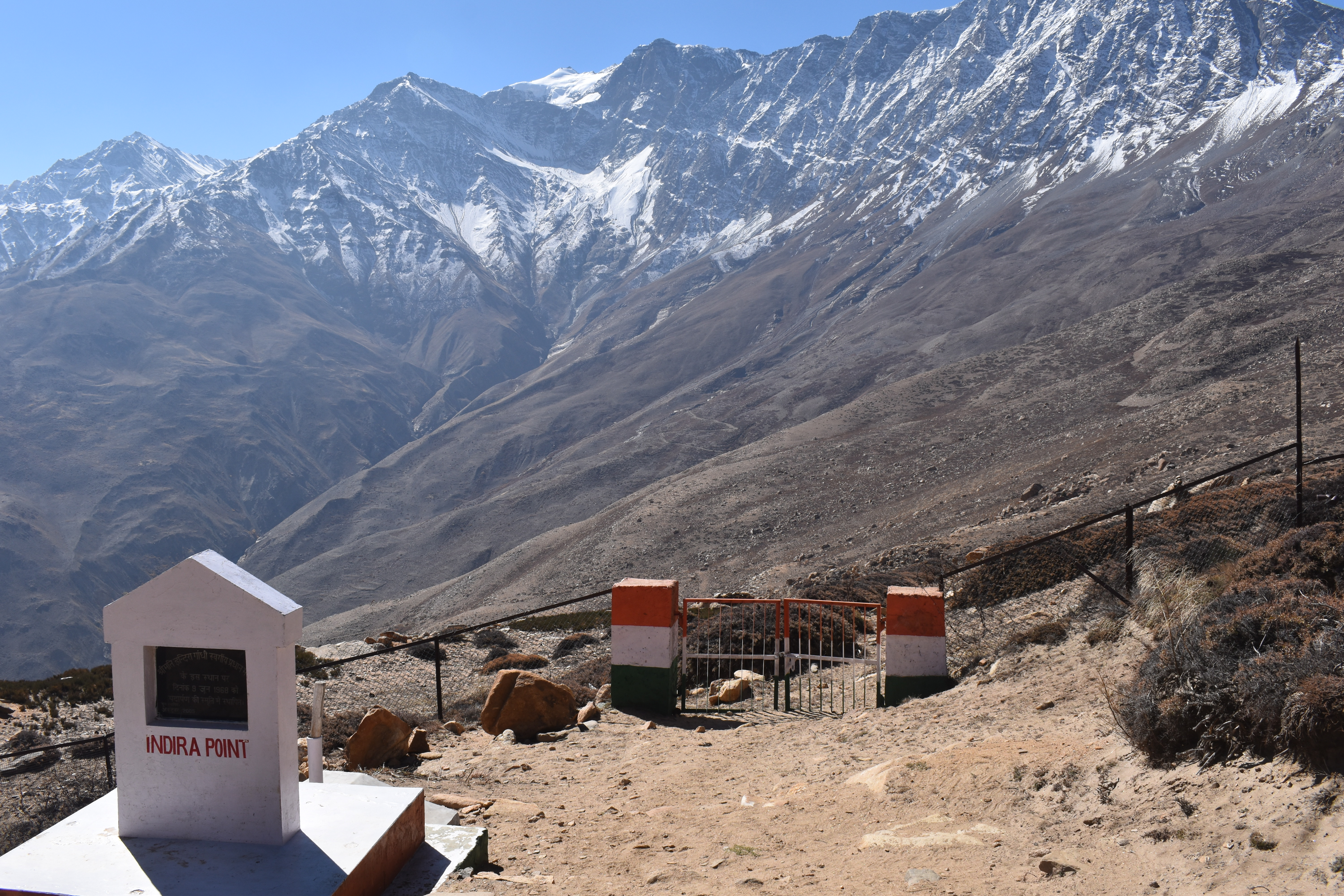
View from Shipki la from Indian side.

Captain Robert Hamond, who travelled from Gartok to the Bashahr State via Shipki La in 1939, described his journey as follows:

The road from Tyak to Shipki is very dangerous and precipitous, sometimes consisting of a rather insecure scaffolding on the face of the cliff, hundreds of feet above the roaring torrent, and is suitable only for porters or goats as the path is often cut into the cliff and one has to bend double to proceed. After 4 miles there is a small village called Korang, and the Sutlej is crossed by bridge, the first since Toling. A mile farther on is Kiuk and, 3 miles past that, Shipki. ... The next day we found that it [our camp] was the other side of the village, and we passed it on our way to the Shipki La. This is the border village and there is a lumbardar (headman) here who speaks Urdu and can be very helpful. The Shipki La is 13,420 feet and is the border between Tibet and Bashahr State. As far as I know it is the lowest pass through the Himalaya and is open for a large part of the year: On the pass I rested and looked back to Tibet, just turning golden-brown in the morning sun. Above me towered the Leo Pargial, below me roared the Sutlej, and ahead of us was home and civilization.

== Sino-Indian trade ==
It was suggested NH 5 could be used as a route for land access to the Arabian Sea as the Karakoram Highway is much more treacherous for transport. This opening of the border at Shipki La is claimed to potentially increase trade on both sides of the border.

== See also ==
- Nathula
- Lipulekh
- Tashigang
- India-China Border Roads
- Line of Actual Control
- List of disputed territories of India
