= Gang Chua =

Mountain in India

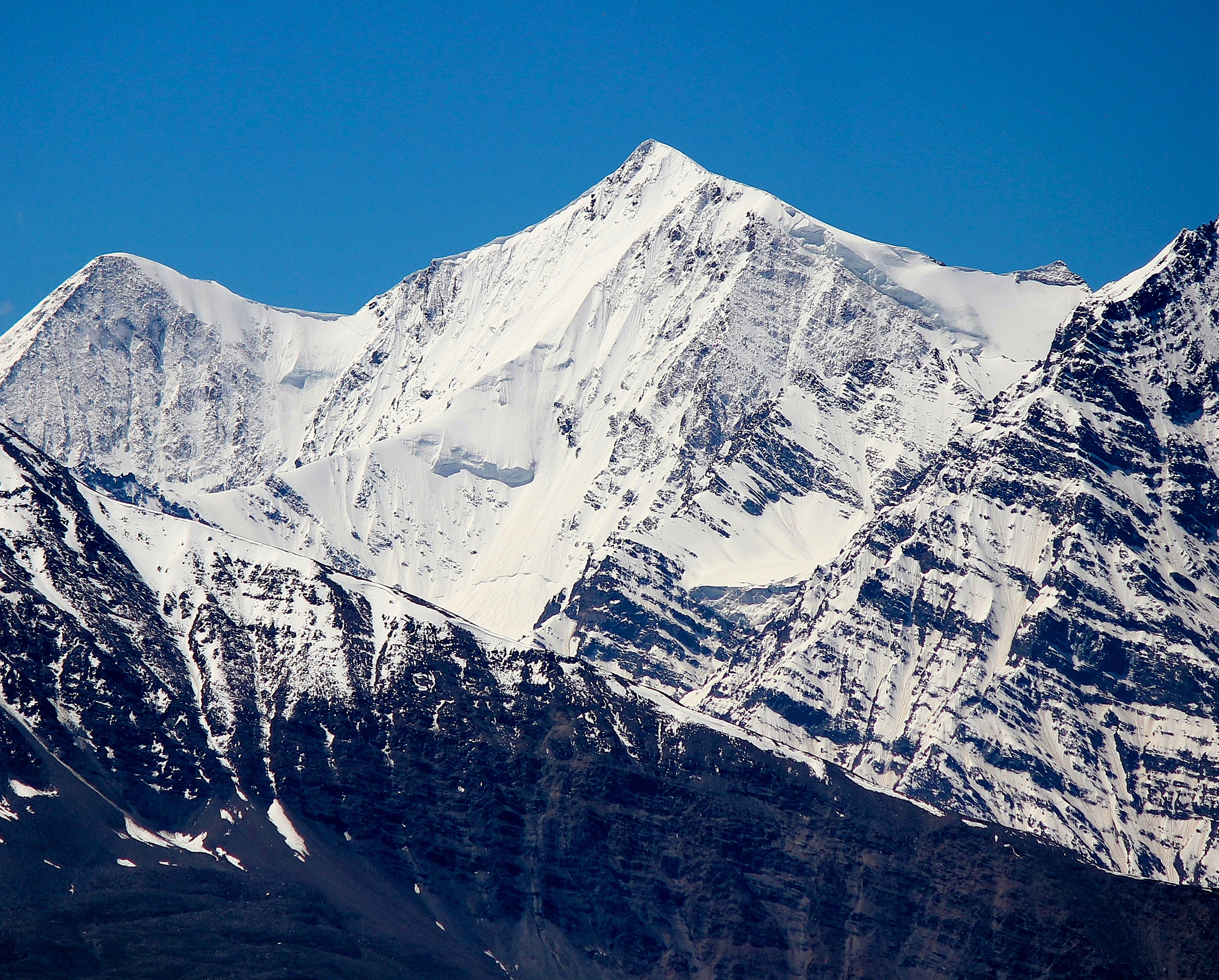
- North aspect

Highest point
- Elevation: 6,288 m (20,630 ft)
- Prominence: 1,057 m (3,468 ft)
- Parent peak: Rangrik Rang
- Isolation: 26.9 km (16.7 mi)
- Coordinates: 31°38′50″N 78°39′13″E

Geography
- Location within India
- Interactive map of Gang Chua
- Country: India
- State: Himachal Pradesh
- District: Kinnaur
- Parent range: Himalayas

Climbing
- First ascent: 1974

Gang Chua is a mountain in India.

== Description ==
Gang Chua is a 6,288-metre (20,630-foot) summit in the Himalayas. The mountain is situated in the state of Himachal Pradesh, 145 kilometres (90 mi) east-northeast of the capital city of Shimla. Precipitation runoff from this mountain's slopes drains into tributaries of the Sutlej River. Topographic relief is significant as the south slope rises 2,300 metres (7,546 ft) above Tagla Khad (stream) in four kilometres (2.5 mi). The first ascent of Gang Chua was achieved on June 16, 1974, by Major F.J. Bahadur, Naik Omkar Chand, and M.A. Naik from the Indian Military Academy.

== Climate ==
Based on the Köppen climate classification, Gang Chua is located in a tundra climate zone with cold, snowy winters, and cool summers. Weather systems are forced upwards by the Himalaya mountains (orographic lift), causing heavy precipitation in the form of rainfall and snowfall. July through September is the monsoon season. The months of April, May and June offer the most favorable weather for viewing or climbing this mountain.

== Gallery ==
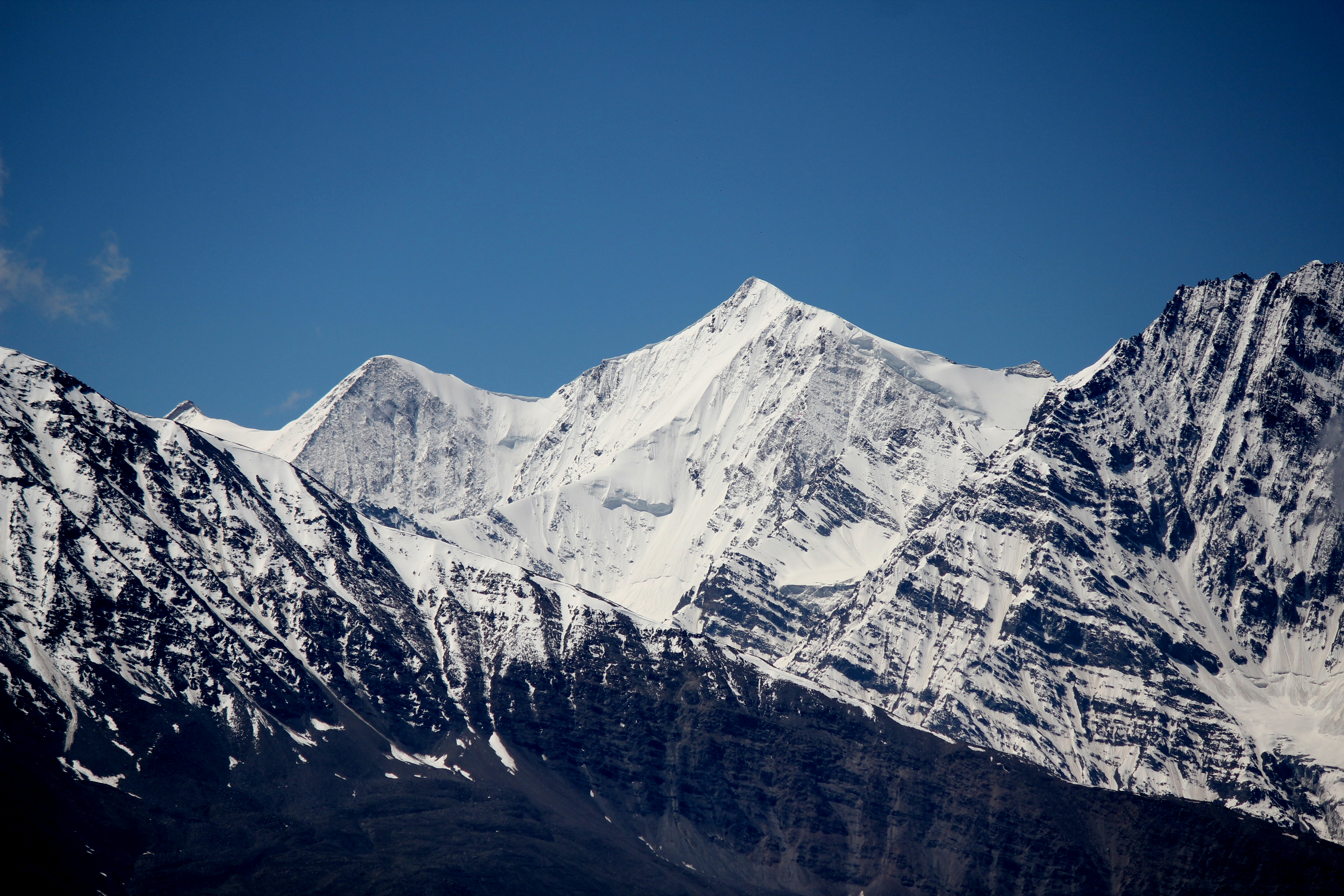

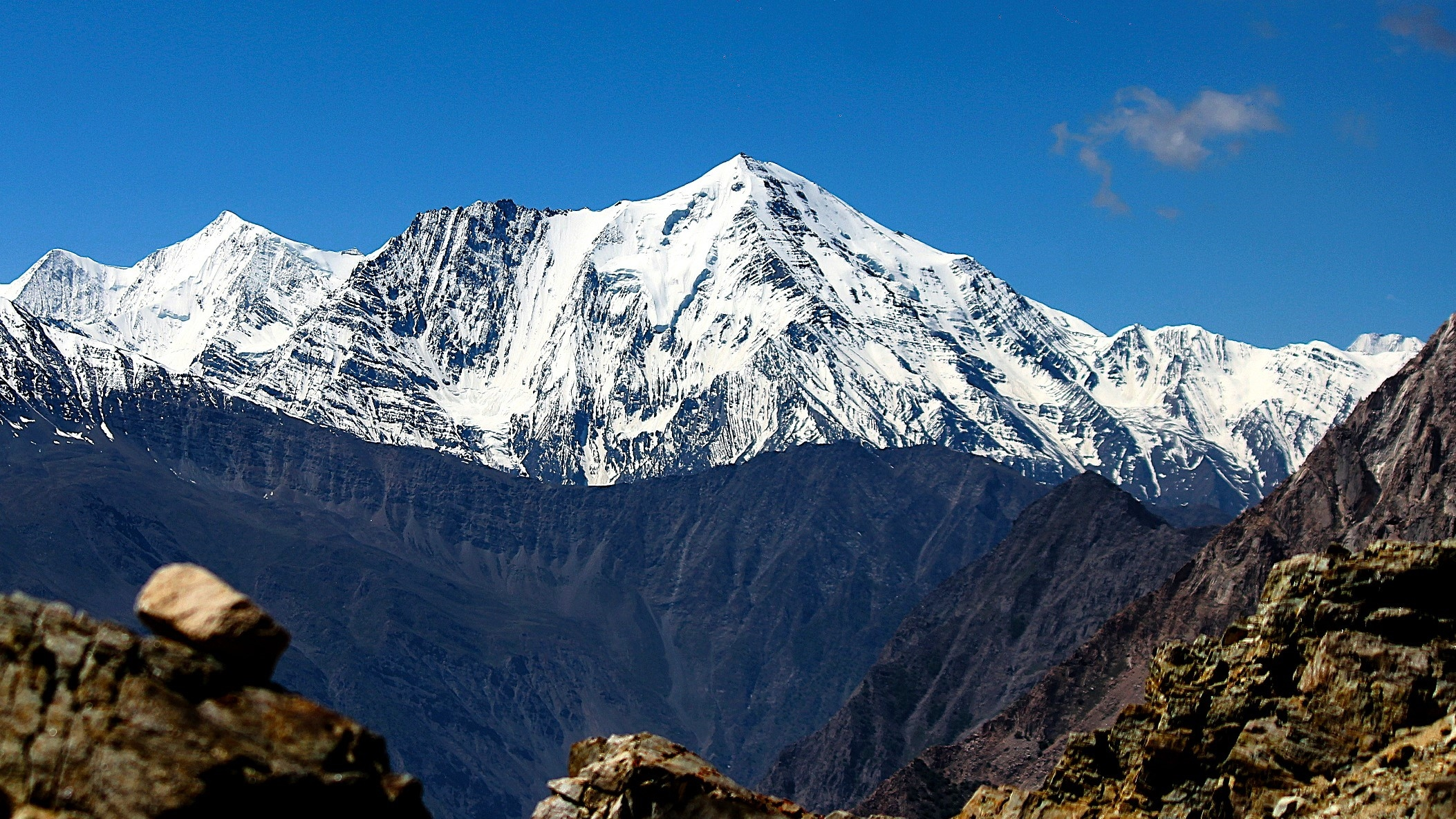
Gang Chua to left

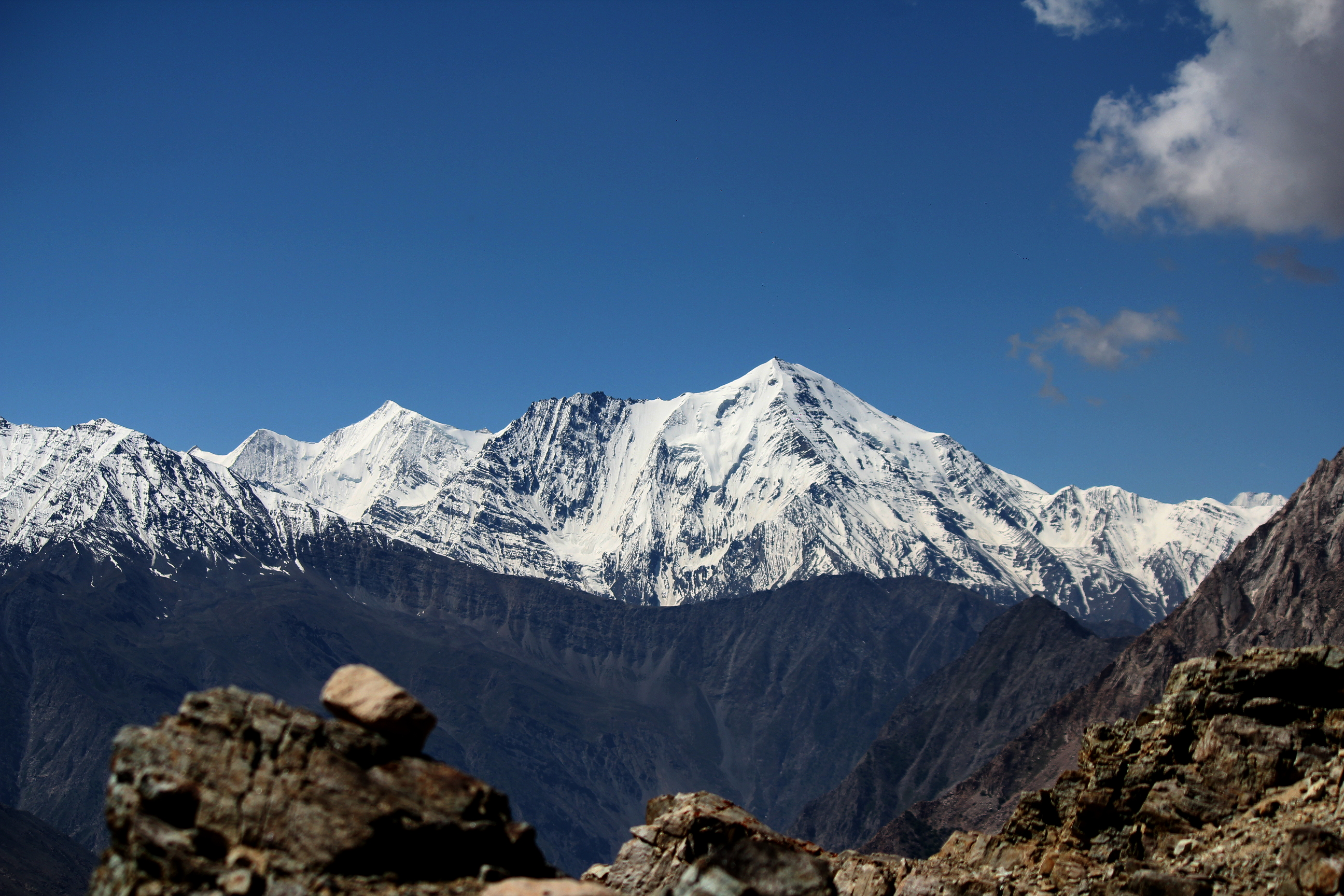
Gang Chua to left

== See also ==
- Geology of the Himalayas
