= Pooh, India =

Pooh
- Town
- Location in Himachal Pradesh, India Pooh (India)
- Coordinates: 31.7667°N 78.5833°E
- Country: India
- State: Himachal Pradesh
- District: Kinnaur

Government
  - Body: Nagar Palika
- Elevation: 2,262 m (7,421 ft)

Population
  - Total: 1,192

Languages
  - Official: Hindi
  - Native: Bhoti Kinnauri
- Time zone: UTC+5:30 (IST)

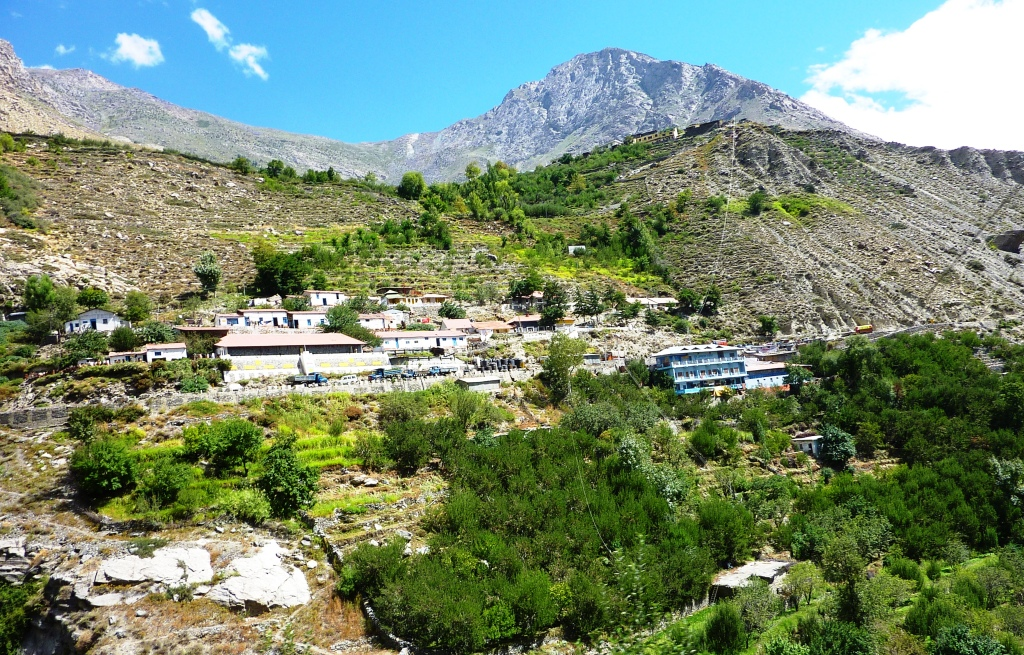
Poo Town, Kinnaur, Himachal Pradesh, India.

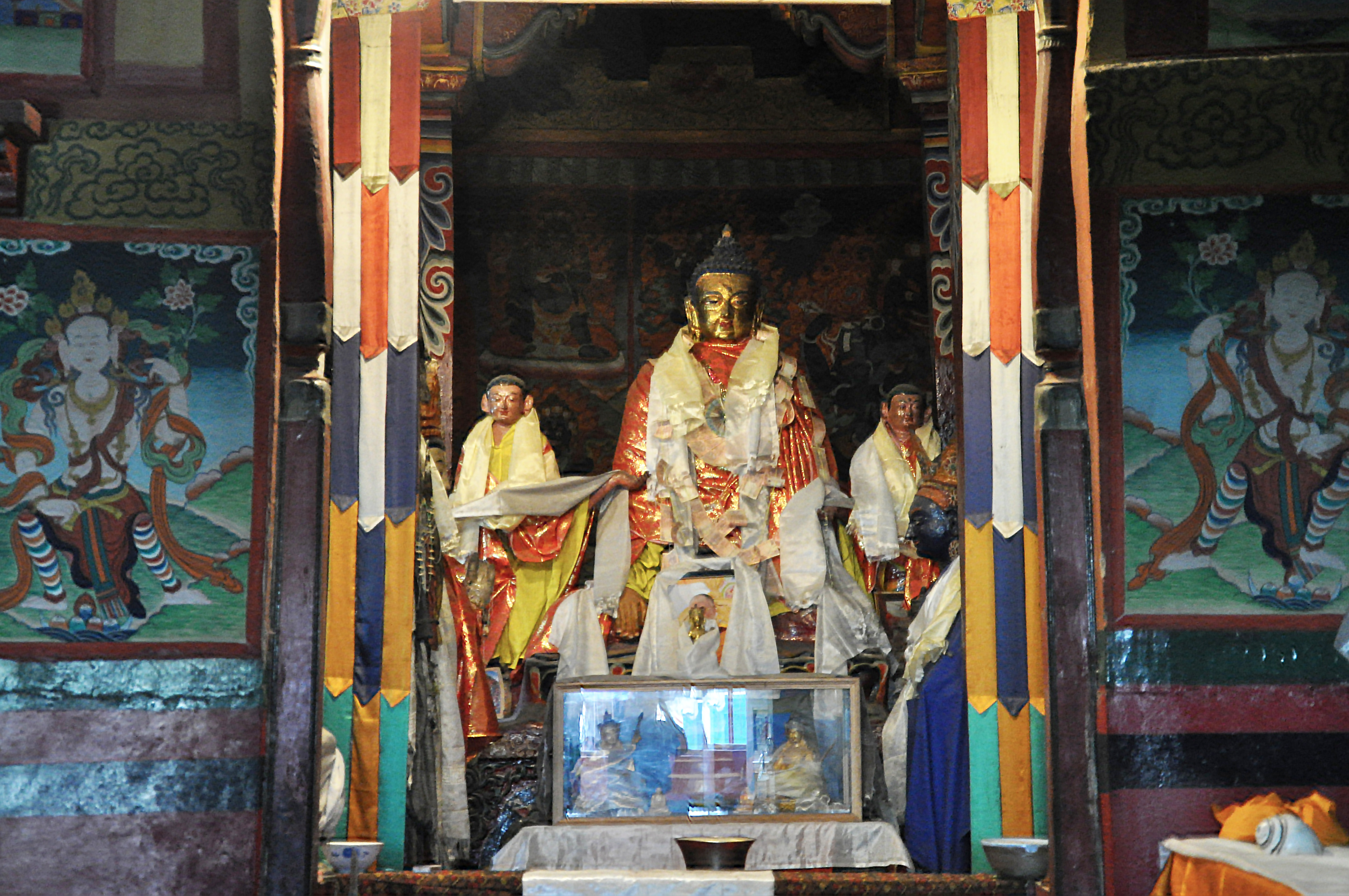
Sakya Muni Buddha Puh Gompa

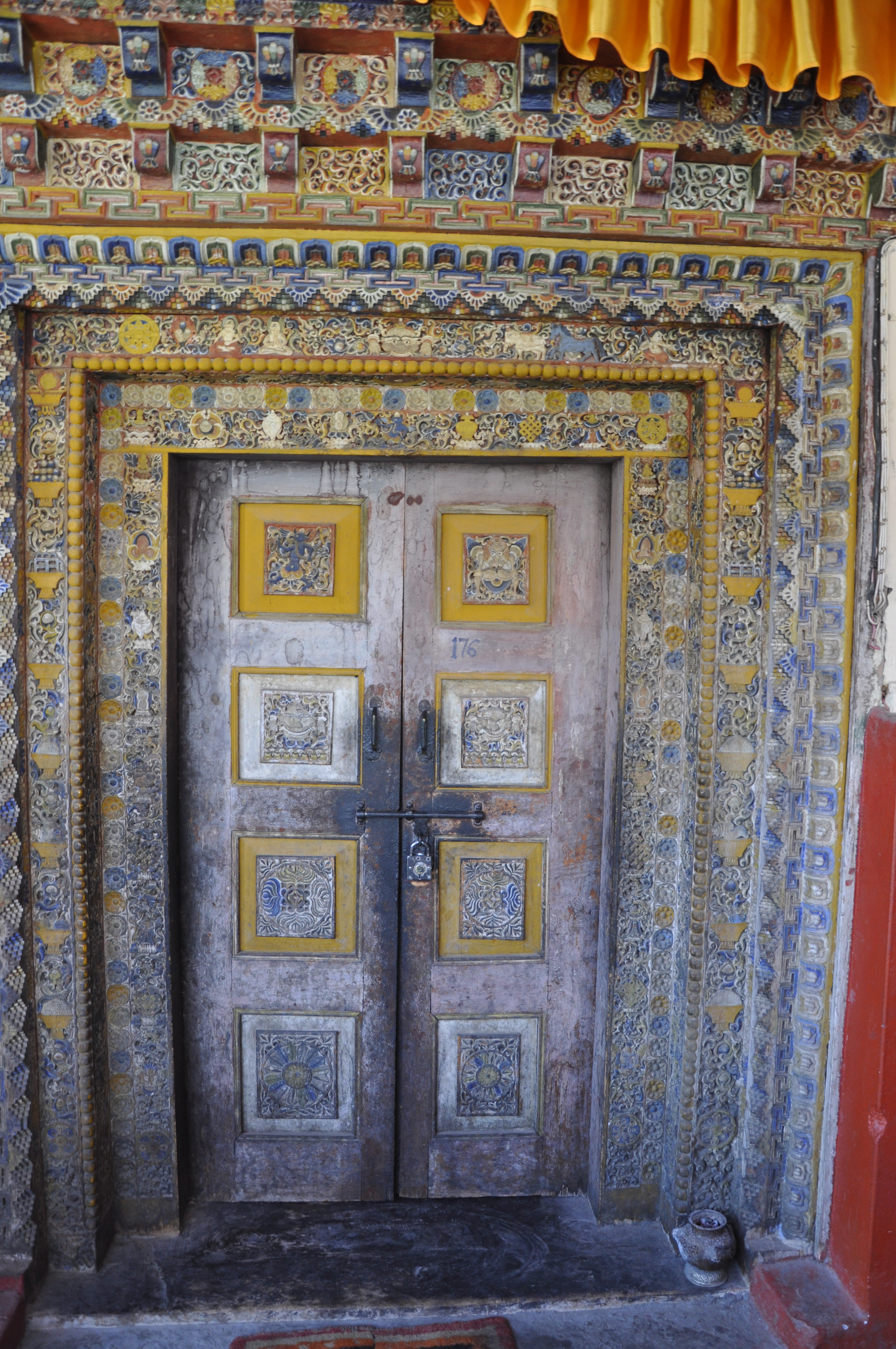
Ancient Wooden door - Puh Gompa

Pooh, or Poo, also known as Spuwa (altitude 2,662 metres or 8,736 ft), is a small town in Kinnaur district, Himachal Pradesh, India. The approximate population given within a 7 km radius of the town is 1,192. It is roughly 18 km from the Line of Actual Control.

Pooh is 58 km from Powari village along National Highway 5 (formerly NH-22. In 2020, construction of a roughly 150 km road between Pooh and Chumar was approved, to shorten the existing 720 km connection between the border towns.

It is known for its natural environment, green fields, apricot orchards, vineyards and almond trees. Inscriptions suggest that Poo was an important trading center in the early 11th century.

When A. H. Francke arrived in Poo from the south in July, 1910, it was the first village he found where the language was "entirely Tibetan".

There is an ancient temple, Lotsaba-bai-lha-khang, dedicated to Shakyamuni or Buddha and attributed to the translator (or Lotsaba), Rinchen Zangpo (958–1055). The shrine has wooden columns supporting a high ceiling. It has murals and a painted door from the period of Rinchen Zangpo (10th to 11th century), though they are in a poor state of preservation.

There is a local pre-Buddhist deity, Dablā, who has no dwelling or altar in Poo (although he has a devata temple devoted to him at Kanum). His only manifestation is a pole with a small idol set on its upper portion and adorned with yak tail hair and long pieces of coloured cloth.

== Bibliography ==
- Francke, A. H. (1914, 1926). Antiquities of Indian Tibet. Two Volumes. Calcutta. 1972 reprint: S. Chand, New Delhi.
- Handa, O. C. (1987). Buddhist Monasteries in Himachal Pradesh. Indus Publishing Company, New Delhi.
