= Mount Gya =

Mountain in China/India

Coordinates: 32°32′14.4″N 78°23′37.3″E

Mount Gya (simplified Chinese: 盖亚山; traditional Chinese: 蓋亞山) is a mountain peak located at 6,795 m (22,293 ft) above sea level. It is located in India near the tri-junction of Tibet (China), Ladakh (India) and Himachal Pradesh (India).

'Gya' means many things, including 'Hundred', 'White', and 'Long pointed Chinese beard'.

== See also ==
- List of ultras of the Himalayas
