= Bhaba Nagar =

Bhaba Nagar Sungra
- Town
- Nickname: Pashkay
- Location in Himachal Pradesh, Kinnaur India Bhaba Nagar (India)
- Coordinates: 31°33′55″N 77°56′5″E
- Country: India
- State: Himachal Pradesh
- District: Kinnaur
- Assembly constituency: Kinnaur assembly constituency

Government
  - Type: Democratic
  - Assembly MLA: Jagat Singh Negi
- Elevation: 1,500 m (4,900 ft)

Languages
  - Official: Hindi
  - Native: Pahari Kinnauri
- Time zone: UTC+5:30 (IST)
- PIN: 172115
- Telephone code: 01786
- Vehicle registration: HP 26
- Website: hpkinnaur.nic.in

Bhaba Nagar, also known as Sungra or Bawa Nagar, is a town in Himachal Pradesh, arranged between Taranda and Nathpa Jhakri Dam, on the left bank of the river Satluj around 12 km downstream from Wangtu.

The township, previously known as Sungra or Pashke, was settled to oblige the workers of Bhaba hydroelectric plant by the Himachal Pradesh State Electricity Board. The town is now the de facto headquarters of Nichar tehsil of the district Kinnaur.

Bhaba Nagar is neighboured by villages such as Kangos, Kache, Nichar, Thanang, Ponda, Bari, Baro, Nigulsari and Taranda on the left bank of Satluj. On the right bank of Satluj the town is neighboured by villages including Gharshu, Nathpa, Kachrang, Rockcharang, Kamba, Rupi, Shorang and Salaring.

Over the years, Bhaba Nagar (Sungra) has become a commercial and cultural hub for the lower part of the Kinnaur. Every year, during the summer, a three-day cultural festival known as Jatru is organised at Bhaba Nagar. Bhaba Nagar is also the second biggest commercial centre in Kinnaur after Reckong Peo.
