= Kinnauri Shawl =

Type of Himachal Pradesh shawl

Kinnauri Shawl is a type of shawl manufactured in Kinnaur district of the Indian state Himachal Pradesh. The shawls are known for their geometric designs.

In October 2010, the shawl was registered by the Indian government under the provisions of the Geographical Indications of Goods Act, 1999 which prohibited unauthorized production of the shawl which would invite INR 2 lakh punishment or three years imprisonment.

== Designs ==
Known for their intricate geometric designs, objects of religious importance are weaved on these shawls with colours of mythological origins. The colours used have a meaning with green signifying air, blue - ether, white - water, yellow standing for earth and red for fire. The geometric designs give the shawls a Central Asian influence.

== Weaving ==
Shawls for commercial purposes are woven with frame loom, pitlooms shawls cater to the local usage. The weavers weave to pieces of half length shawl with similar designs, and after completion are joining at the centre through stitching. On average, it takes around 45 days to complete a single shawl.
