= Nichar =

Nichar is a village located in the Kinnaur district of Himachal Pradesh state, India, at an altitude of 2100 meters. It is located on the old Hindustan-Tibet road. Most of the people follows Hinduism as well as Buddhism. It is known for natural water body called "chhalang bayu". The Usha Mata temple is in Nichar. The people of Nichar celebrate a fair called 'HU HU mela' (BAATI mela in local language). Nichar is one of the three administrative areas of Kinnaur distt. The region has a variety of flora and fauna and is home to wildlife species such as red bears, antelopes, and Ghoral. Nichar has wide range of alpine forest. That's why it is called as green valley. It is most green village in distt Kinnaur. The temperature of Nichar remains moderate throughout the year and hence, tourist can visit here in any season. With its natural environment and wildlife, it has become one of the most sought-after places to visit in Kinnaur. It has PIN-code 172103.

This village is situated between Taranda & Wangtu.
