= Kamru, Himachal Pradesh =

Village in Kinnaur district of Himachal Pradesh

Coordinates: 28°50′N 78°51′E

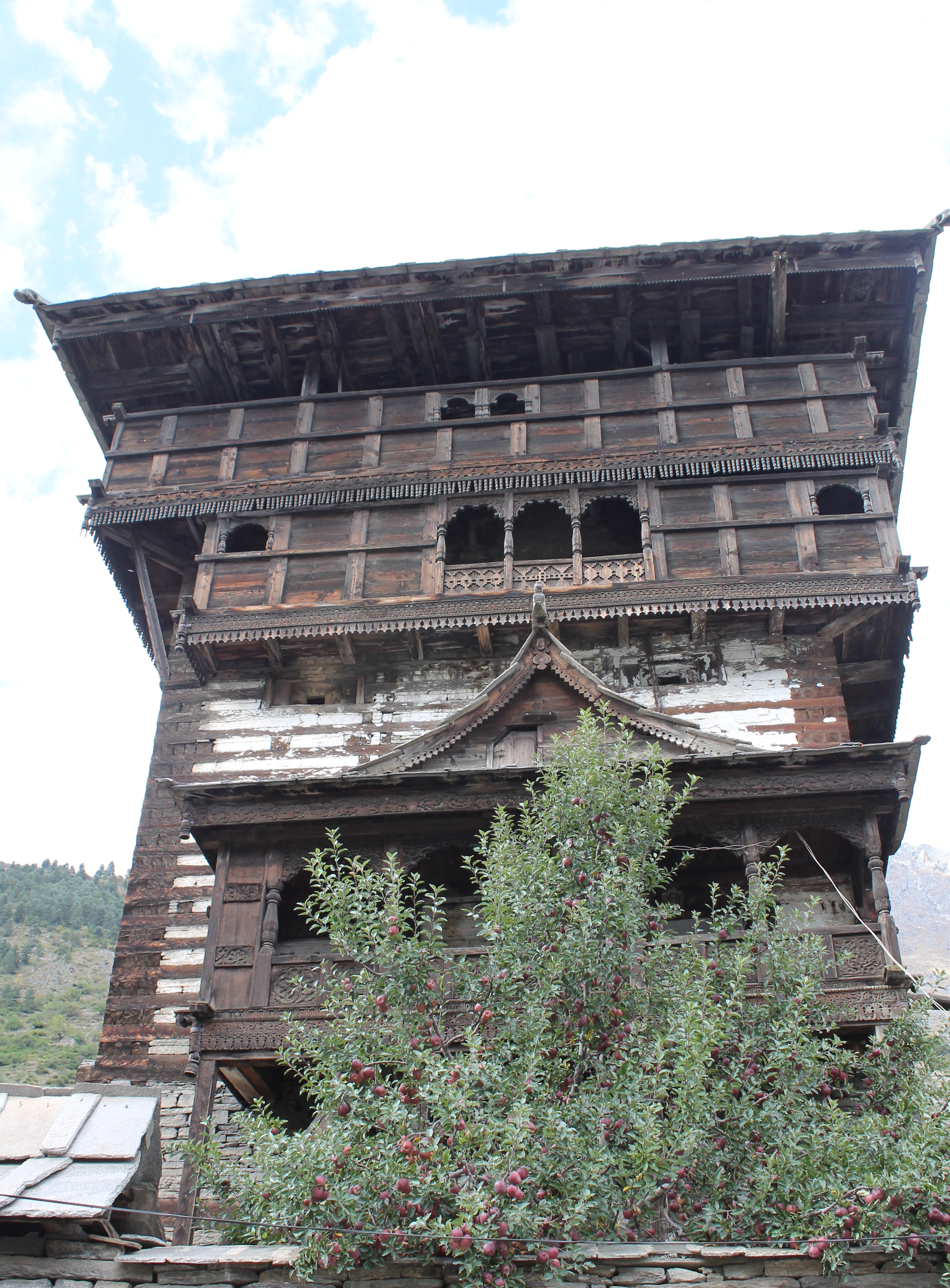
Kamru fort

Kamru is a village located in the Sangla Valley of Kinnaur district, Himachal Pradesh, India. It sits c. 2,900 m above sea level and is about 2 km from the tourist town of Sangla, on the foot of Kinner-Kailash (House of Lord Shiva).

== History ==
The village is an ancient capital of the Bashahr principate. It is especially known for the tower-like fort at its highest point, which was made by Pandavas thousands of year ago. Inside the fort there are about 33 types of gods and goddess. There is also a shrine to Kamakhya Devi inside the fort campus, which was brought there many years ago from Assam.

Kamru was capital of the Bushahr principality. It is especially known for the tower-like fort at its highest point, which was built by Lord pandavas thousands of year ago. According to a folklore fort there are about 33 koti(33 type) gods and goddess residing in the fort.

The Kamru fort is a 7 storeyed building. Bottom two storeys are made of rocks and the rest five storeys are completely made of wood. Nobody except the priest is allowed inside the main fort. Inside the fort there are a lot of weapons and ammunitions used by former kings. These objects will soon be displayed in the museum that is being built outside.
