= Renu Negi =

Indian documentary filmmaker

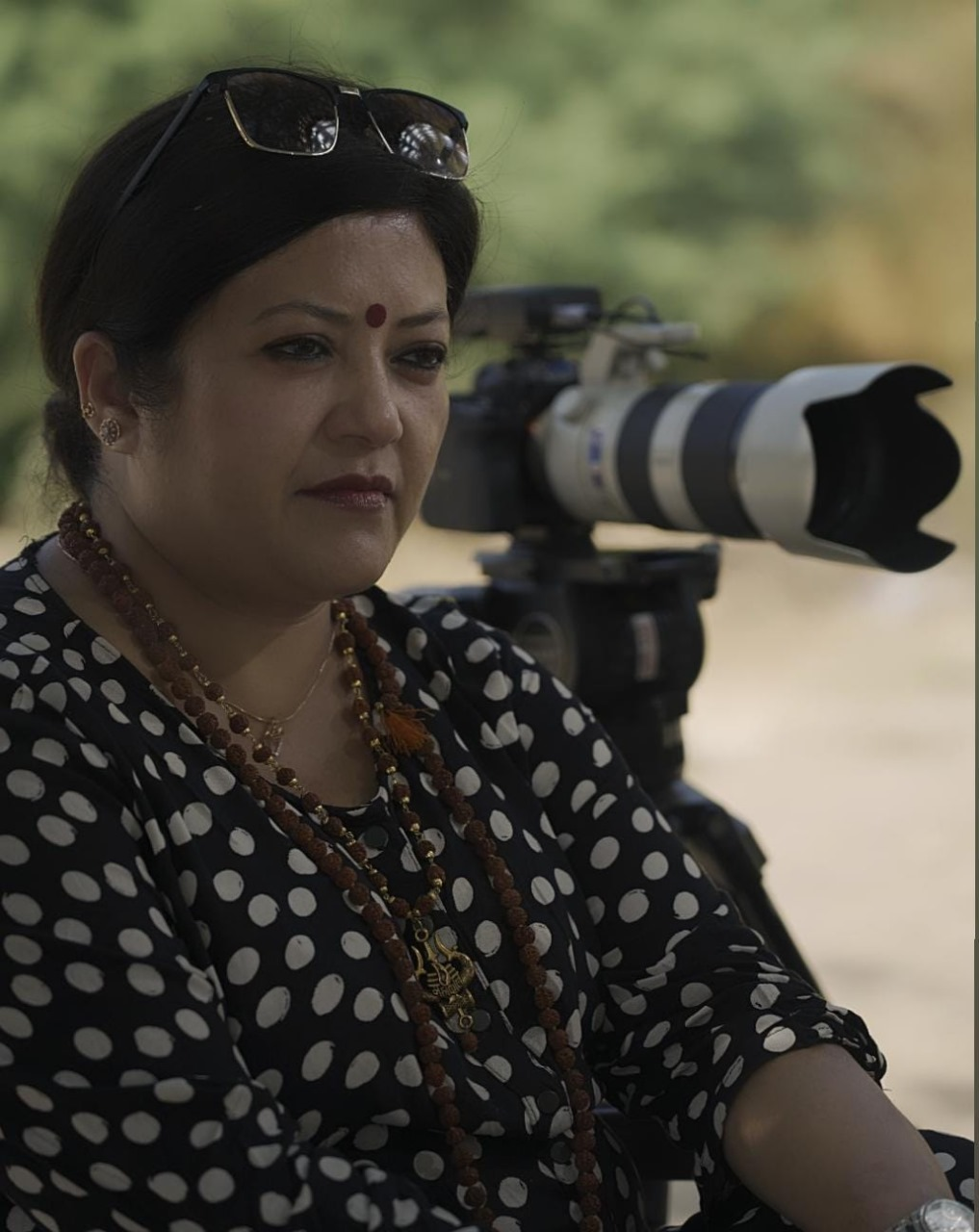
- Born: Kinnaur, Himachal Pradesh, India
- Occupation: Filmmaker
- Years active: 1993–present
- Notable work: Yak-the Ship of Mountain, Dolma, Chambal Ki Chitthi

Renu Negi is an Indian filmmaker. She is the first tribal woman filmmaker from Himachal Pradesh.

Her documentary, Yak-the ship of mountain, won the Silver Beaver Award for Best Science Film and the Special Award For Technical Excellence in Cinematography at the 8th National Science Film Festival in 2018.

== Early life and family ==
Negi was born in a tribal family in the Kinnaur district of Himachal Pradesh. She is the eldest daughter in her family, and has a younger brother and sister. Her father was a craftsman and her mother was a handicraft specialist. Negi's husband is a medical officer, and the couple has two children.

== Career ==
Negi completed her studies in Shimla and completed a filmmaking apprenticeship, during which she refined her craft.

Negi has made several documentaries on travel, lifestyle, art, culture, social causes, etc. prevalent in Himachal and its various tribes. 'Dolma' is one of her notable documentaries talking about the early girl marriage still practised in Kinnaur. Her works 'Ek Nishi Aurat Ki Kahani', based on the Nishi tribe and fiction film 'Wapsi', and other documentaries on tribes like Mishmi, Khamti, Sherdukpen, and Khasis of Meghalaya were telecast as a weekly program on DD National.

In 1998, she started her Delhi-based production house RN Productions. Her recent documentary, Chambal Ki Chitthi, which highlights the water crisis in Rajasthan, was produced under RN Productions' banner. Negi also produced a documentary titled Ghar se door apna ghar, based on Homestays in Himachal.

== Awards and recognition ==
- Silver Beaver Award for the Best Science Film for 'Yak-the ship of mountain'-2018
