= Wangtu =

- Town
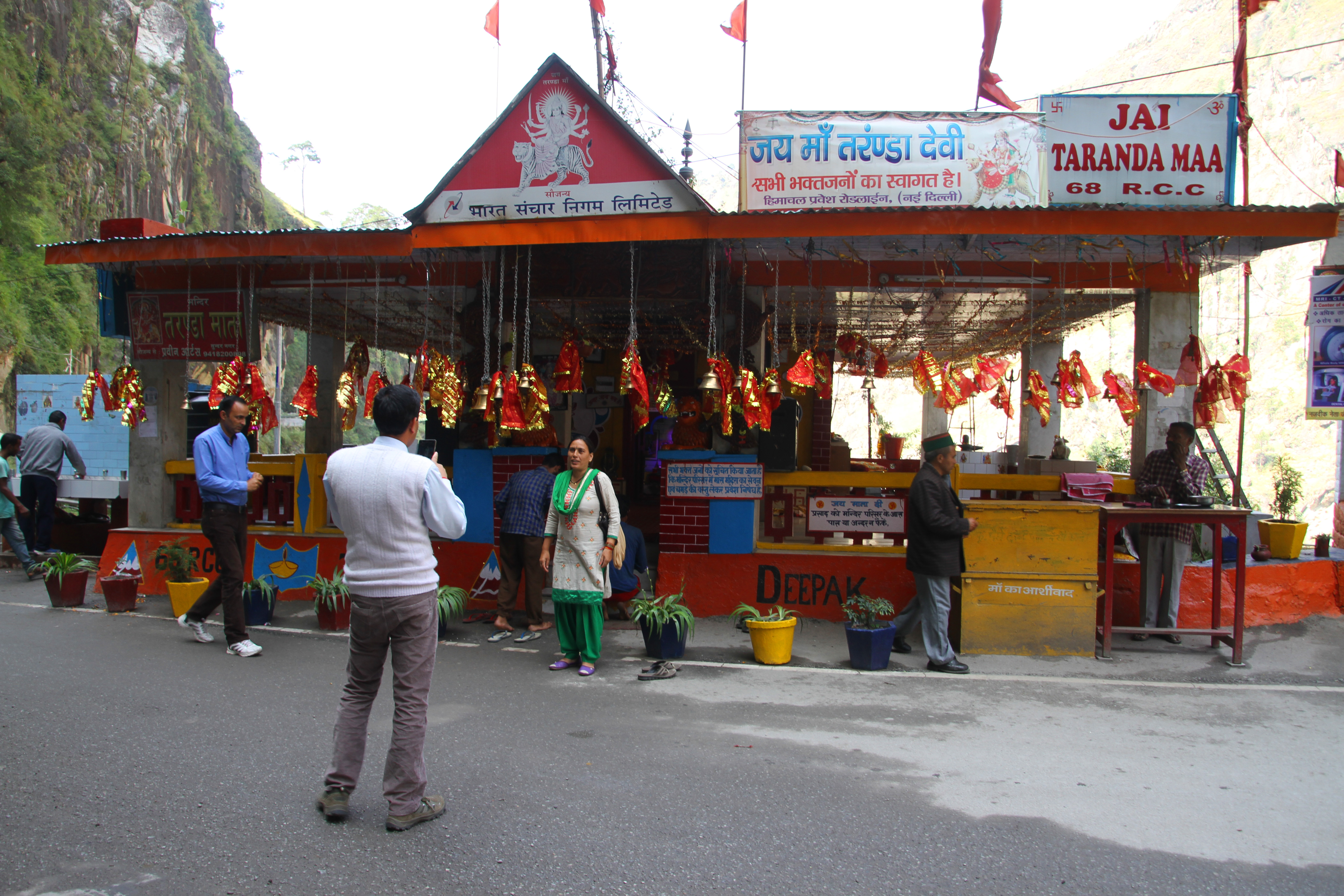
- Temple of Kali

- Location in Himachal Pradesh, India Wangtu (India)
- Coordinates: 31°33′N 78°1′E
- Country: India
- State: Himachal Pradesh
- District: Kinnaur
- Elevation: 1,823 m (5,981 ft)

Population
  - Total: 3,000

Languages
  - Official: Hindi
- Time zone: UTC+5:30 (IST)
- Nearest city: Reckong Peo, Rampur, Kalpa, Pooh, Sangla, Nichar, Morang, Katgaon(Bhaba).
- Lok Sabha constituency: Mandi
- Vidhan Sabha constituency: Kinnaur
- Climate: Cold (Köppen)

Wangtu is a town situated in Kinnaur, Himachal Pradesh, India. Its geographical coordinates are 31°33′N 78°1′E and its original name (with diacritics) is Wangtu. The nearest airport is in Shimla, which is approximately 200 km from Wangtu. It is very close to the Indo-China border, and located on the Old Hindustan-Tibet Road. Wangtu was affected by the 1975 Kinnaur earthquake.
