= Kinnaur district =

- District of Himachal Pradesh
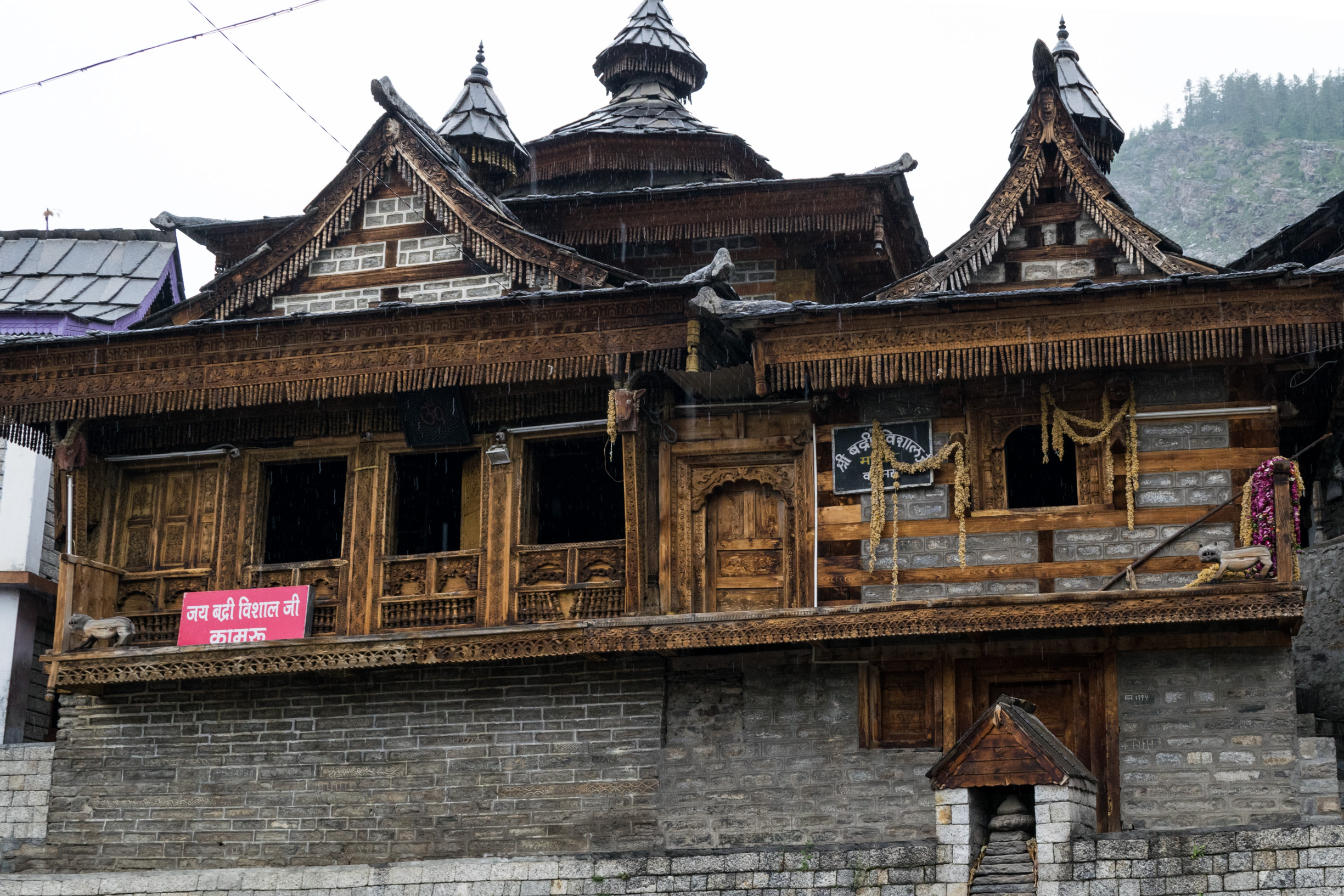
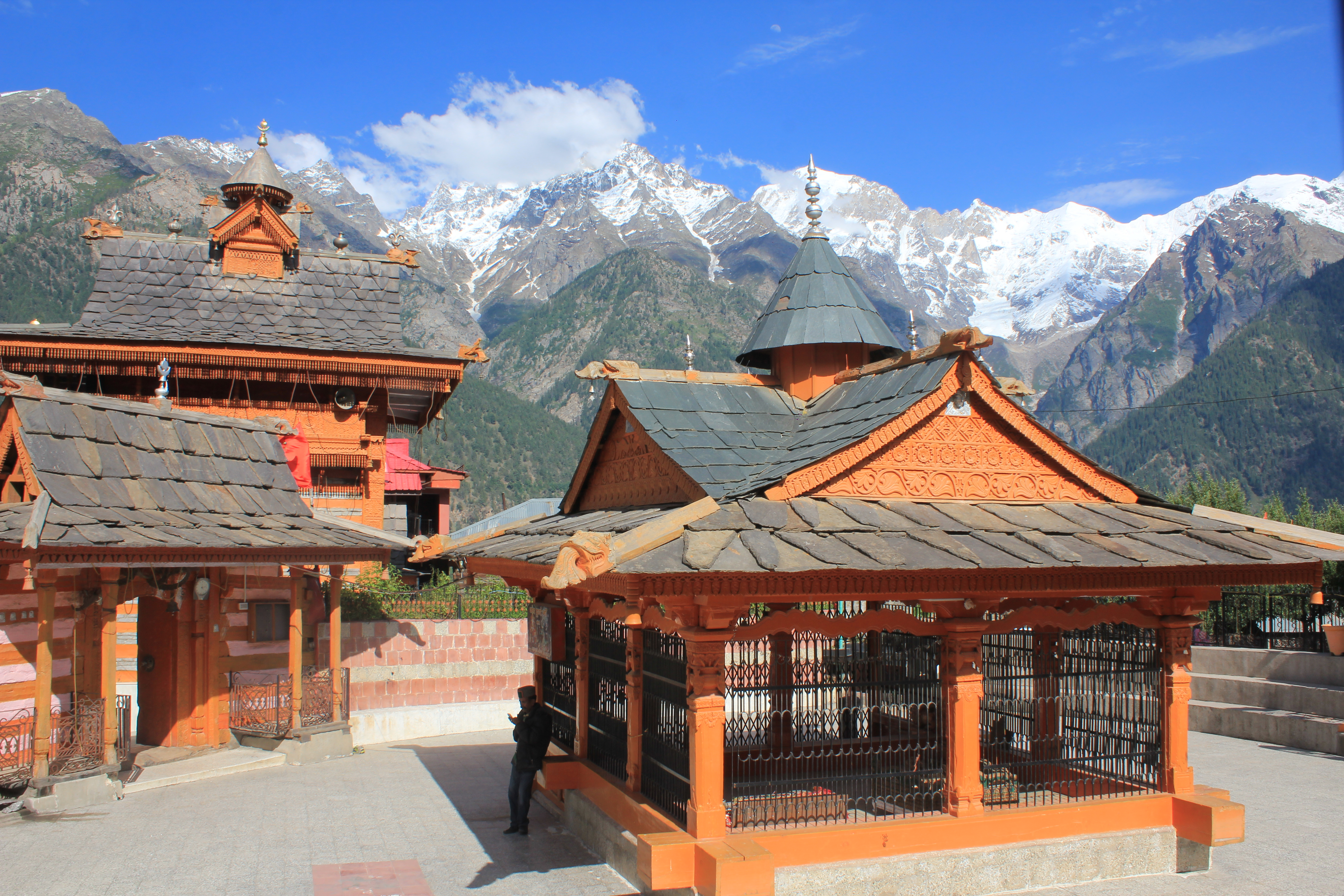
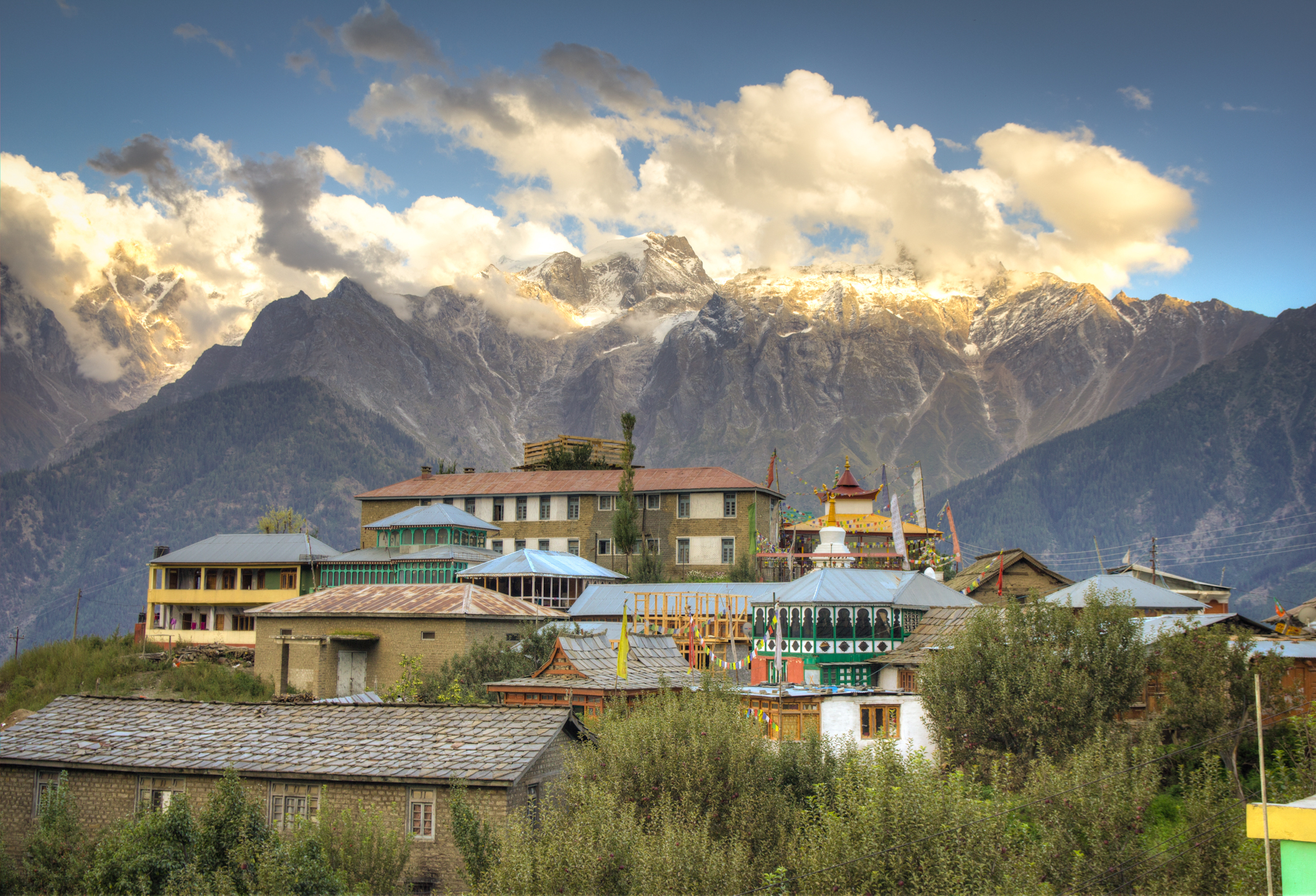
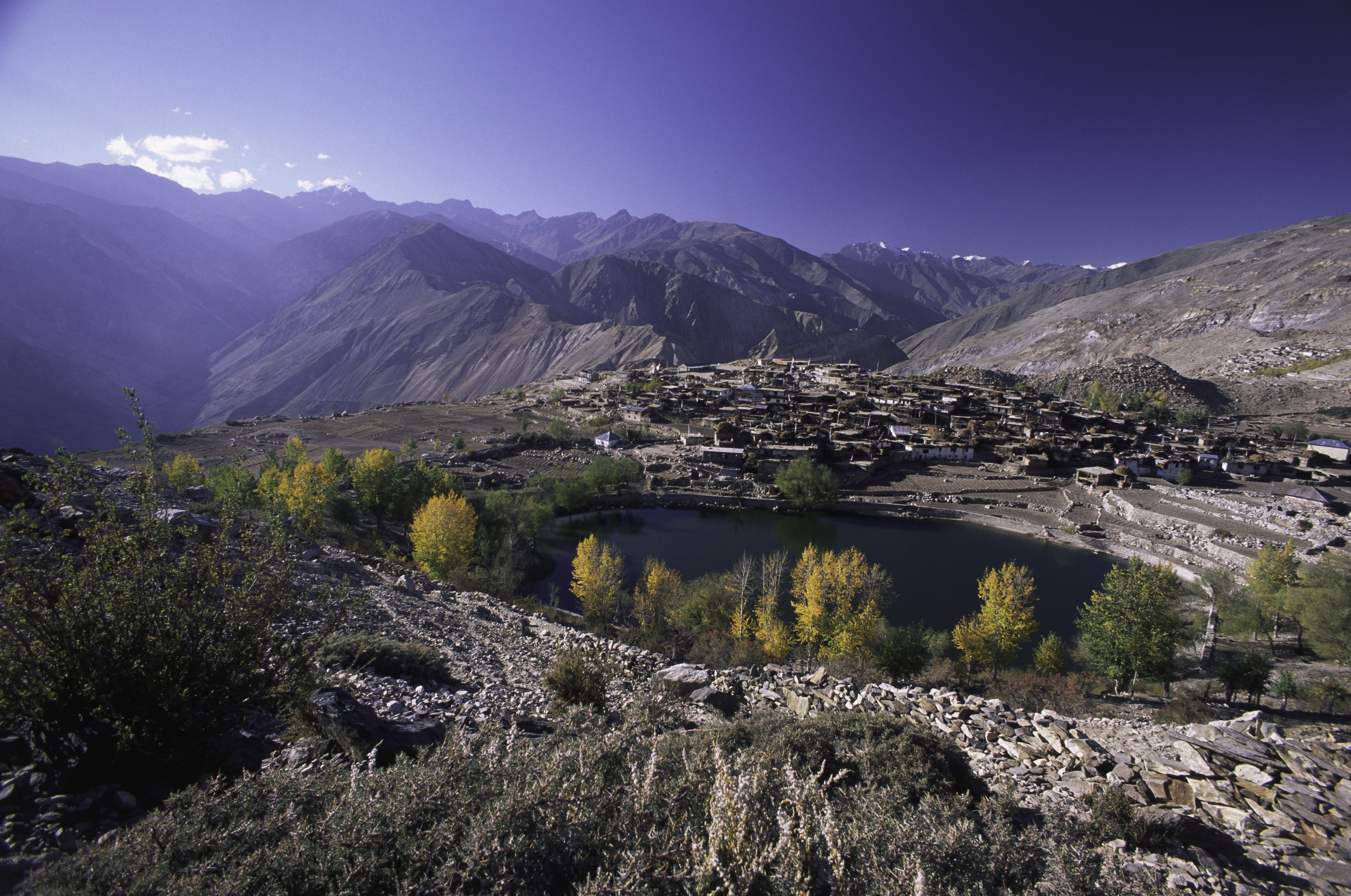
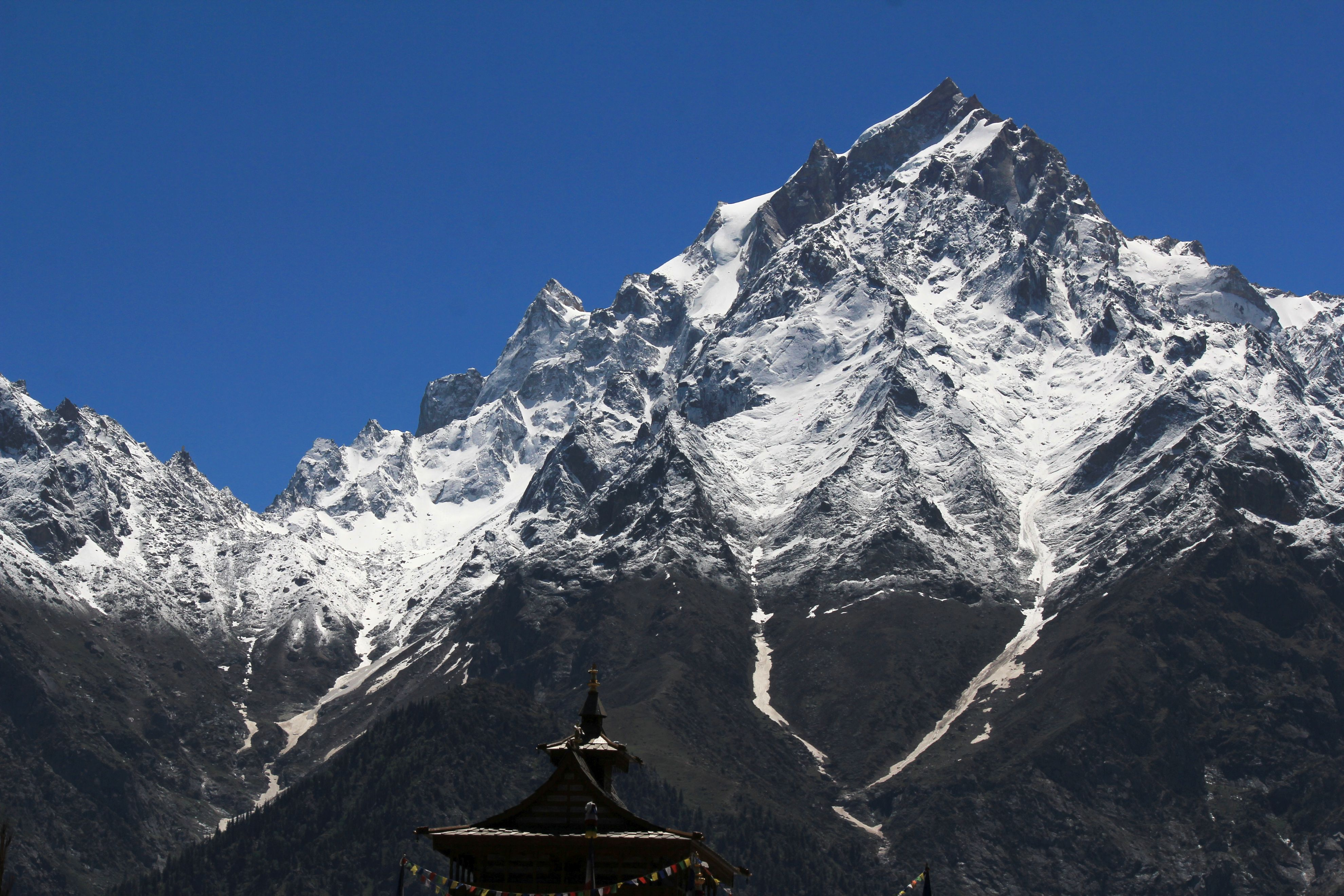
- Clockwise from top-left: Kamru Fort, Chandika Devi Temple, Kalpa, Nako Lake, Kinnaur Kailash as viewed from Kalpa

- Location in Himachal Pradesh
- Country: India
- State: Himachal Pradesh
- Headquarters: Reckong Peo
- Tehsils: Kalpa, Pooh, Sangla, Moorang, Hangrang, Bhaba Nagar.

Area
  - Total: 6,401 km^{2} (2,471 sq mi)

Population (2011)
  - Total: 84,121
  - Density: 13.14/km^{2} (34.04/sq mi)
  - Urban: 0.00%

Demographics
  - Literacy: 88.37%(male), 71.34%(female)
  - Sex ratio: 819

Languages
  - Official: Hindi
  - Regional: Pahari Kinnauri; Kinnauri; Bhoti Kinnauri; Chitkuli Kinnauri
- Time zone: UTC+05:30 (IST)
- Vehicle registration: HP-25, HP-26, HP-27
- Major highways: National Highway 5 (India)
- Website: hpkinnaur.nic.in

Kinnaur district (Hindi: [kɪnːɔːɾ]) is a mountainous district located in the northeast part of the state of Himachal Pradesh, India. Kinnaur district borders Tibet to the east, the state of Uttarakhand to the south, Shimla district to the southwest, Kullu district to the west, and Lahaul and Spiti district to the north. The administrative headquarters of the district is at Reckong Peo. Kinnaur district's south-western parts are part of the historical Mahasu region.

== History ==
Over the 10th-11th centuries A.D., Kinnaur was a part of the Guge kingdom. The Guge kingdom broke apart in the 12th century, and the Bushahr state arose in the Western Himalayas, taking over most parts of present-day Kinnaur. The Bushahr state originated in the Kamru village of Sangla valley. However, the uppermost part of Kinnaur remained under Tibetan influence until the late 17th century, when it was handed over to the Bushahr state by the Tibetans as a reward for assistance in the Tibet-Ladakh-Mughal War. The Bushahr state shifted its capital to Sarahan, and later still to Rampur, which caused this state to be known eventually as 'Rampur-Bushahr'. Rampur-Bushahr was attacked by the Gurkhas in the early 19th century. Soon afterwards, the British gained supremacy in the region. Rampur-Bushahr became a princely state owing suzerainty to the British crown, until India's Independence in 1947. Most of present-day Kinnaur district was known as 'Chini tehsil' under the Rampur-Bushahr state. On 15 April 1948, Rampur-Bushahr became a part of the Republic of India, and a part of an administrative unit called the Mahasu district. In 1960, the Chini tehsil and fourteen villages of the neighbouring Rampur tehsil were separated from the Mahasu district to create the new district of Kinnaur.

== Geography ==
Kinnaur is an entirely mountainous district. The general altitude range is 1,500 metres above sea level to over 6,000 metres above sea level. The district is drained by several tributaries of the Sutlej River. Three mountain ranges run through or touch Kinnaur: the Zanskar Range, the Great Himalaya Range, and the Dhauladhar Range. The highest peak of Kinnaur district, Leo Purgyil (6,816m), is also the highest peak of Himachal Pradesh state. The Kinner Kailash peak (6,050m), a regional pilgrimage site for Hindus, is also located in Kinnaur.

Administratively, Kinnaur is the third largest district by size in Himachal Pradesh, with an area of 6,401 sq. km. The district has five tehsils (Nichar, Kapla, Sangla, Pooh, and Moorang) and one sub-tehsil (Hangrang). For development purposes, the district is divided into three developmental blocks—Nichar, Kalpa, and Pooh.

== Demographics ==
According to the 2011 census, Kinnaur district has a population of 84,121. This gives it a ranking of 620th in India (out of a total of 640). The district has a population density of 13 inhabitants per square kilometre (34/sq mi). Its population growth rate over the decade 2001-2011 was 7.61%. Kinnaur has a sex ratio of 819 females for every 1000 males, and a literacy rate of 80%. The entire population was rural. Scheduled Castes and Scheduled Tribes make up 17.53% and 57.95% of the population respectively.

Historical population
Year	Pop.	±% p.a.
1901	27,232	—
1911	28,470	+0.45%
1921	28,191	−0.10%
1931	30,445	+0.77%
1941	33,238	+0.88%
1951	34,475	+0.37%
1961	40,980	+1.74%
1971	49,835	+1.98%
1981	59,547	+1.80%
1991	71,270	+1.81%
2001	78,334	+0.95%
2011	84,121	+0.72%

=== Languages ===
Languages of Kinnaur district (2011)
1. Kinnauri (72.0%)
2. Hindi (8.03%)
3. Nepali (7.03%)
4. Pahadi (3.47%)
5. Bhojpuri (1.04%)
6. Others (8.38%)

Kannaura people speak about nine language varieties, eight from Sino-Tibetan language family; Kinnauri, Chitkuli, Sumcho, Jangrami, Poo Kinnauri, Wangpo Kinnauri, Sunam, Nesang and one from an Indo-Aryan language family, called Pahari Kinnauri. At the 2011 census, 72% of the population in the district spoke or knew native languages of Kinnaur, 16.65% Hindi and 7.03% Nepali as their first language. However, Hindi is fast emerging as the language of choice in most domains, especially young speakers, due to the demands of modernity which has threatened the native languages.

=== Religion ===
Religions in Kinnaur district (2011)
Religion	Percent
Hinduism	76.95%
Buddhism	21.50%
Christianity	0.58%
Islam	0.53%
Other or not stated	0.44%
Distribution of religions

Block	Hindu	Buddhist	Other
Kalpa	17,773	1,142	275
Nichar	26,383	910	392
Sangla	13,422	375	245
Hangrang	405	4,190	64
Pooh	2,409	5,704	196
Morang	3,833	6,281	124

== Politics ==
No.	Constituency	Member	Party	Remarks	Reference
68	Kinnaur (ST)	Jagat Singh Negi	Indian National Congress		

== Climate ==
Most of Kinnaur has a temperate climate, due to its high elevation. Winters last from October to May, while summers last from June to September. The upper areas of the Sutlej valley and an adjoining lower part of the Spiti valley (which also falls under the Kinnaur district) lie in the rain shadow area, with an arid climate similar to Tibet. In this region, winters are long and harsh, with snowfall, while summers are mild. The lower parts of the Sutlej valley and the Baspa valley receive monsoon rains over July to September. The rains vary from moderate to heavy, making some areas prone to landslides.

== Flora and fauna ==
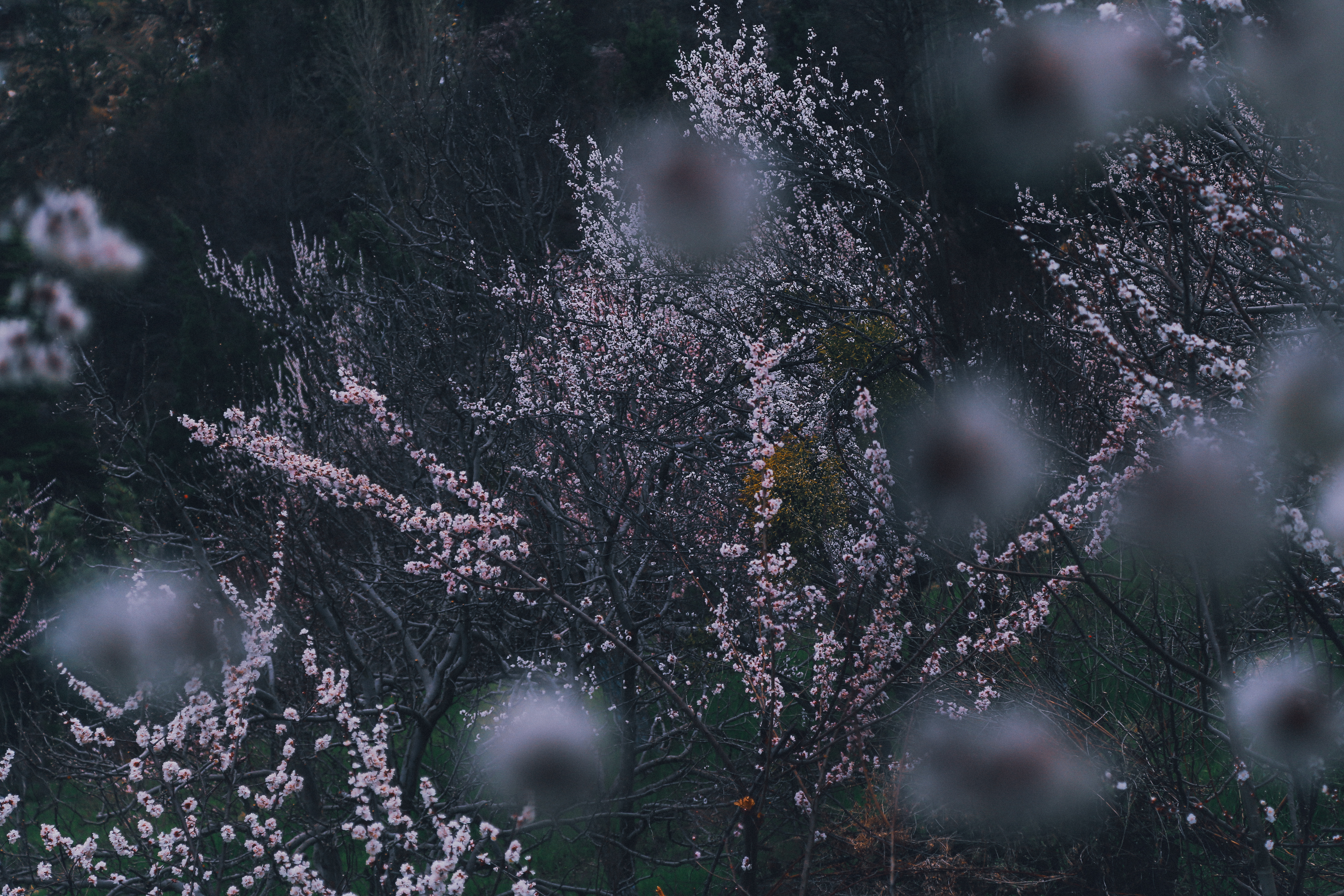
Apricot Flowering Kinnaur, Himachal Pradesh

Portions of Kinnaur are situated high in the Himalaya, where vegetation is sparse and consists primarily of hardy grasses. Alpine species such as juniper, pine, fir, cypress, and rhododendron can be found at elevations between 3,500 and 5,000 metres, primarily in Middle Kinnaur. At lower altitudes, temperate-climate trees are found, including oak, chestnut, maple, birch, alder, magnolia, apple, and apricot.

Kinnaur district has two protected areas:

=== Rupi Bhaba Wildlife Sanctuary ===
This sanctuary, established in 1982, covers 503 sq.km. The flora includes kharsu, oak, weeping fig, alpine, chir pine, Himalayan temperate forest, coniferous and dry broad leaved coniferous. The fauna includes the western tragopan, the cheer pheasant, the snow leopard, the brown bear, the Himalayan tahr, the blue sheep, and musk deer.

=== Lippa-Asarang Wildlife Sanctuary ===
This sanctuary, established in 1974, covers 30.90 sq.km. Much of this sanctuary is a cold desert. Key fauna found there include the wild yak, Asiatic black bear, snow leopard, brown bear, musk deer, goral, blue sheep, and ibex.

== Transport ==
=== Air ===
The nearest airport is Shimla Airport.

=== Rail ===
The nearest railway station is Shimla, which is connected by a narrow-gauge railway line to Kalka near Chandigarh.

=== Road ===
Kinnaur can be reached by the National Highway 05 via Shimla. Buses of the Himachal Road Transport Corporation ply from Shimla to different parts of Kinnaur.

== Notable people ==
- Khunu Lama Tenzin Gyaltsen, Buddhist scholar and poet
- Renu Negi, documentary filmmaker
- Shyam Saran Negi, the first person to cast a vote in independent India
- Thakur Sen Negi, politician
- Chhonzin Angmo, first visually impaired woman to summit Mt. Everest.

== Gallery ==
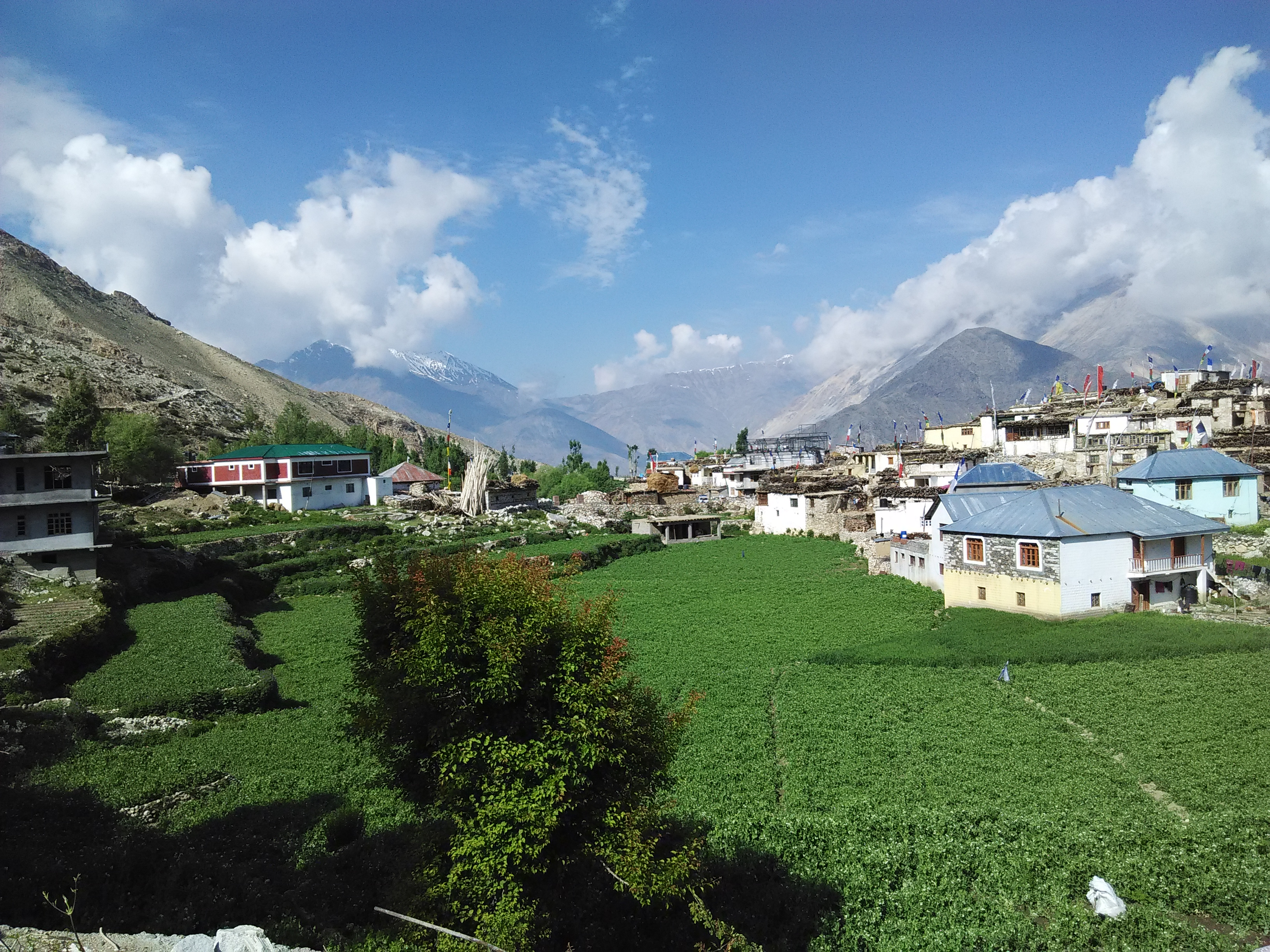
Nako

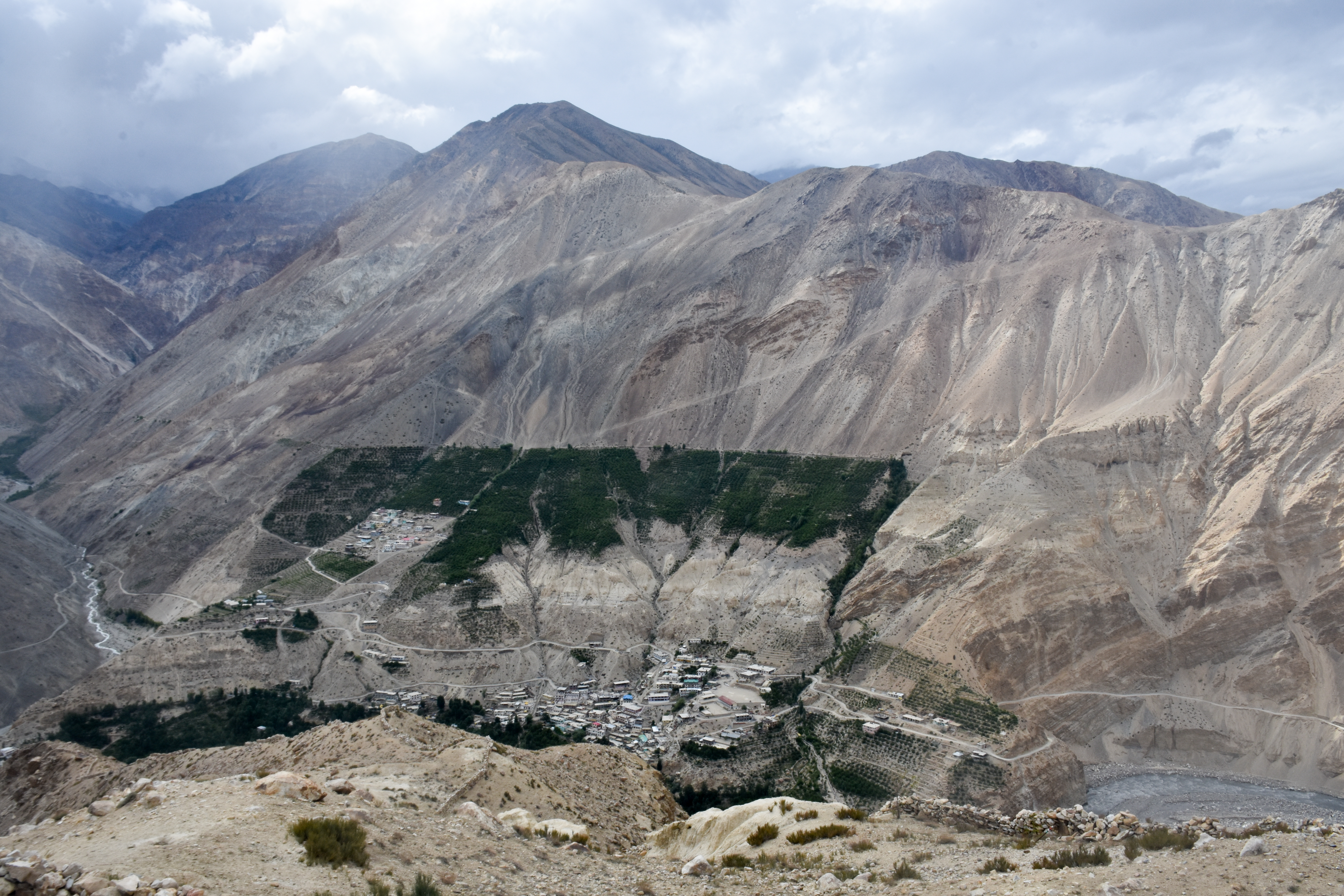
Leo, view from NH-505 near Nako

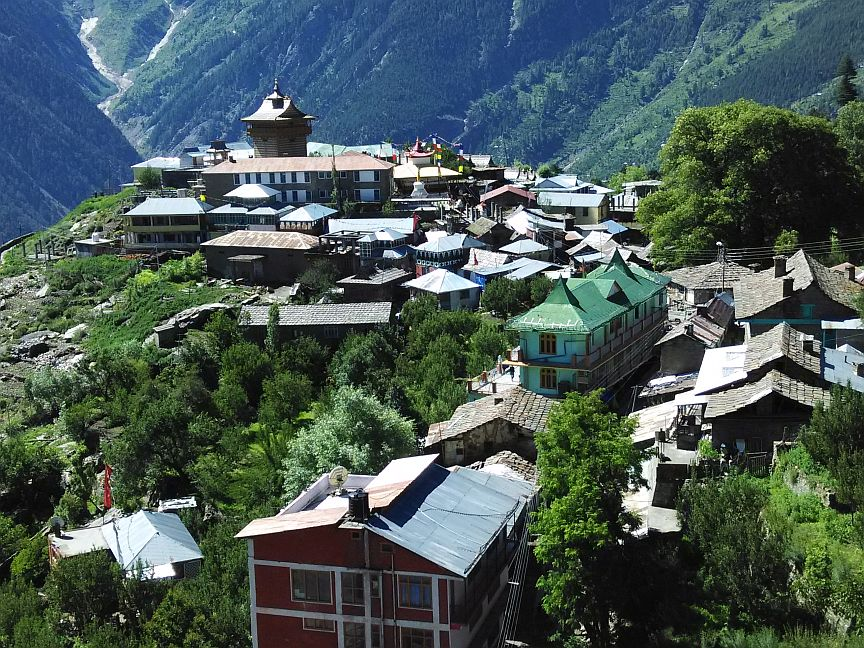
Kalpa

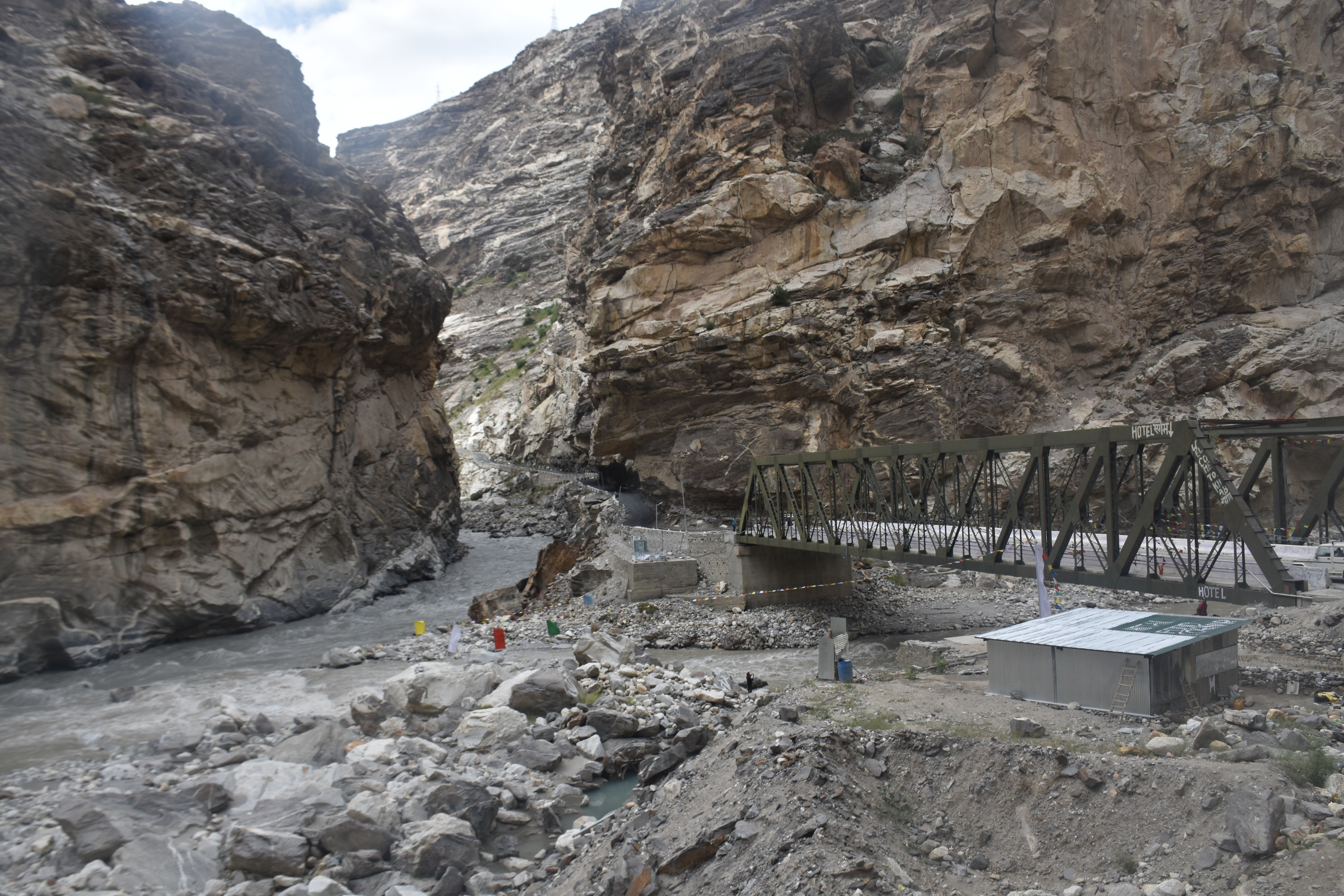
Confluence of the Spiti (left) with the Satluj (right) near Khab

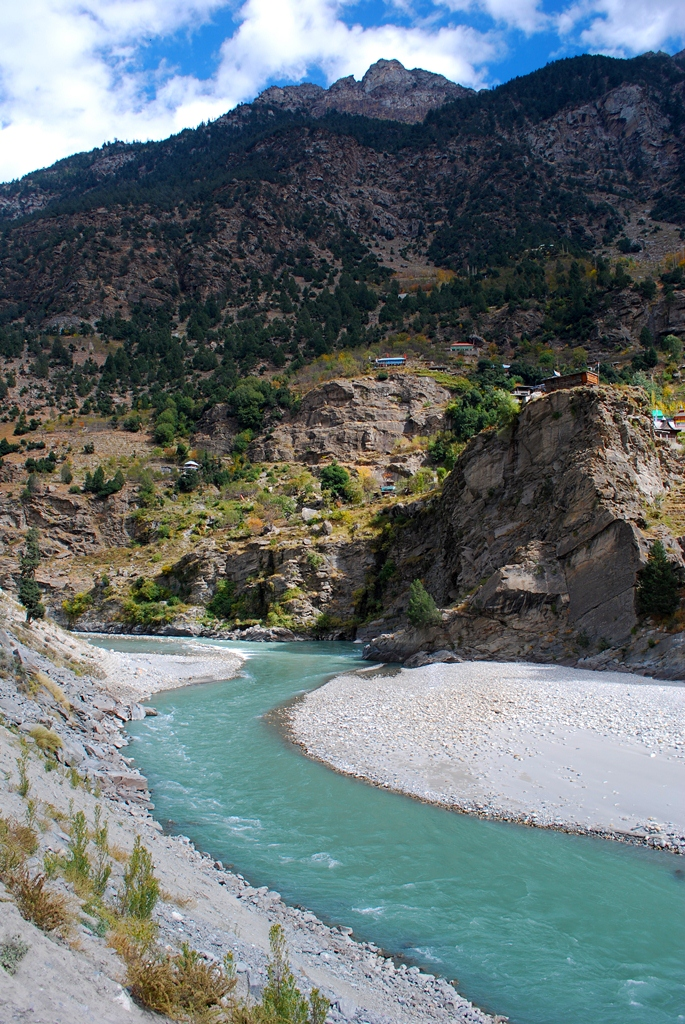
Sutlej River in Kinnaur Valley

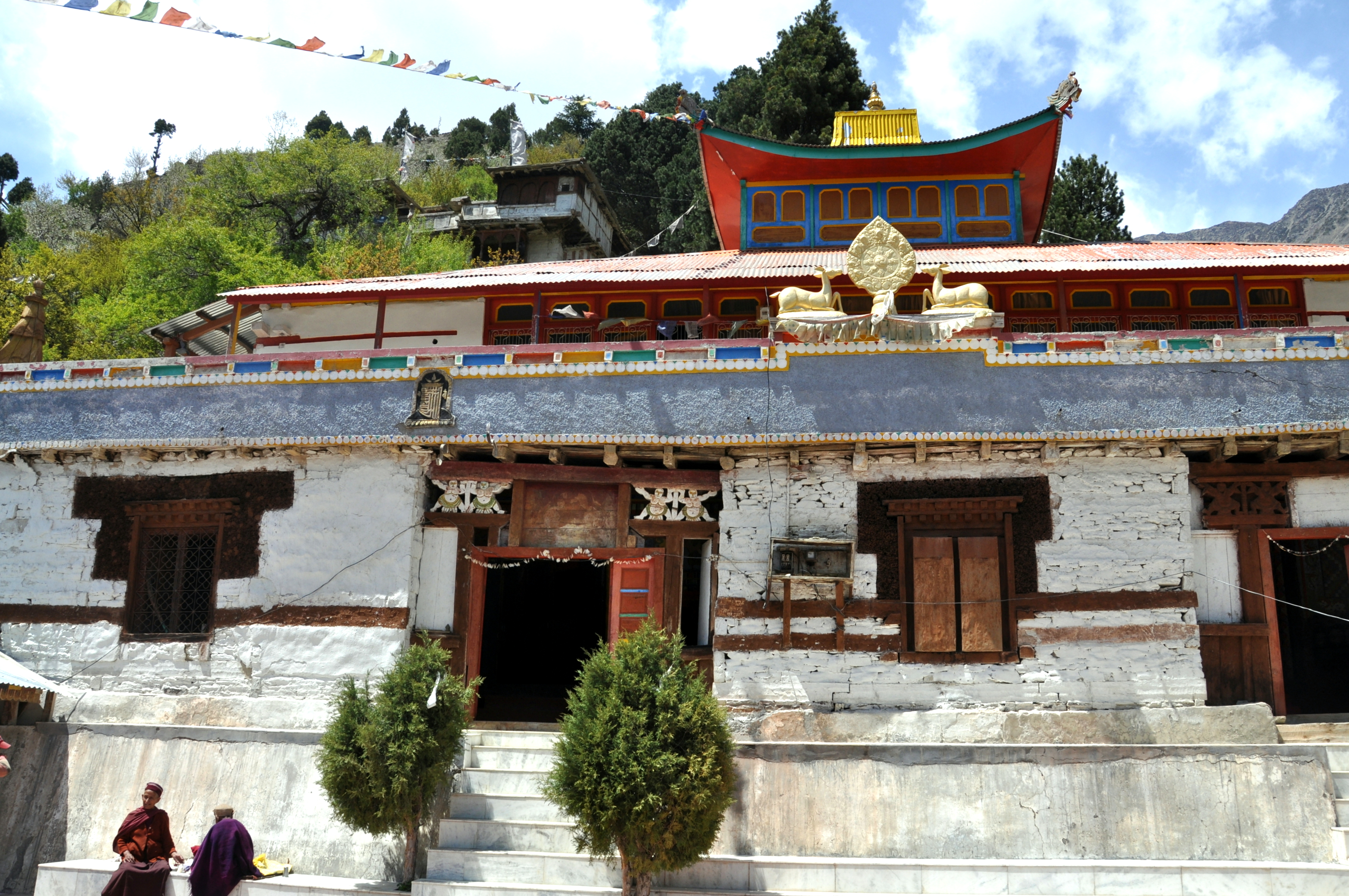
Drukpa Kagyu monastery at Lippa village

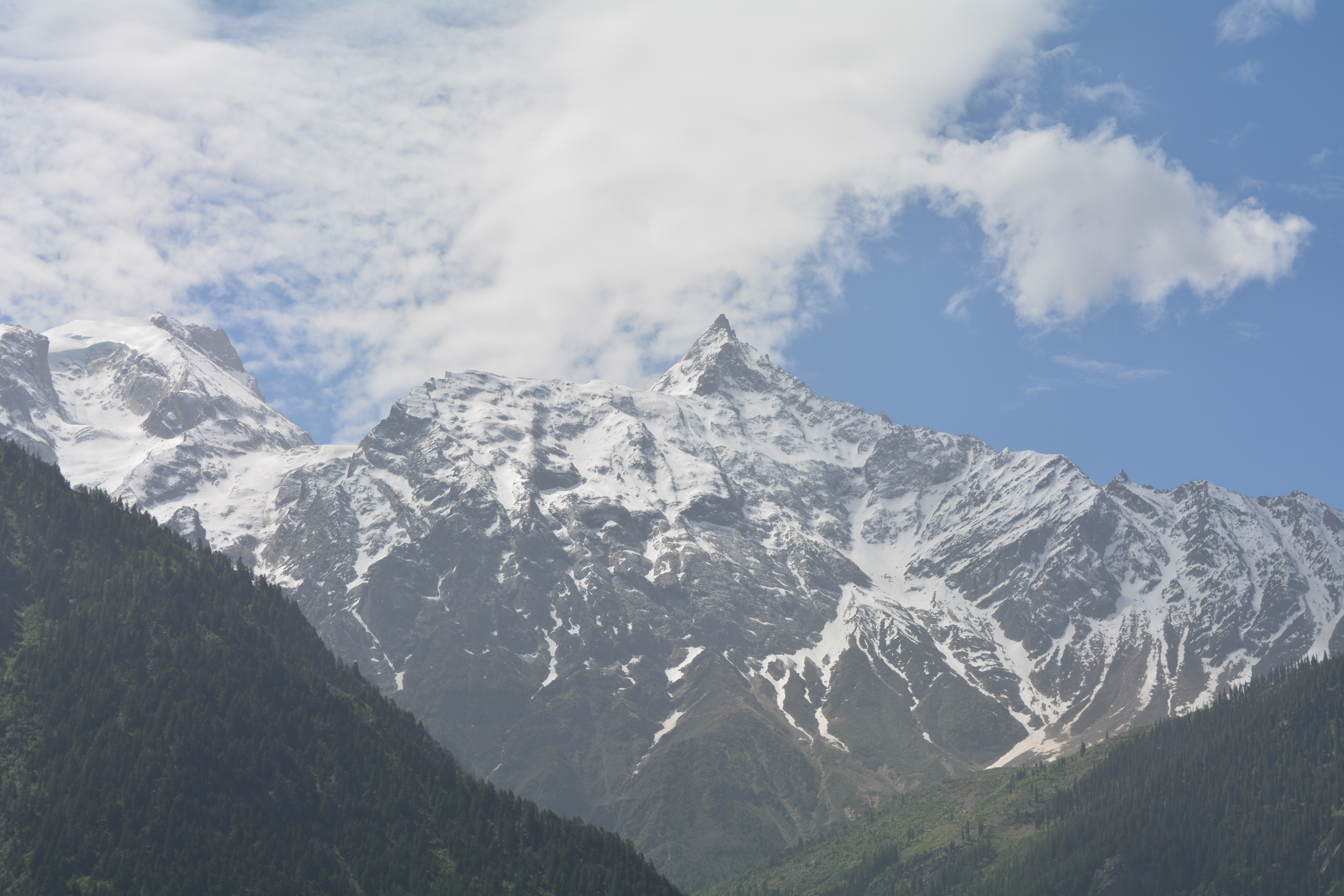
Mt Kinner Kailash, Kinnaur district.

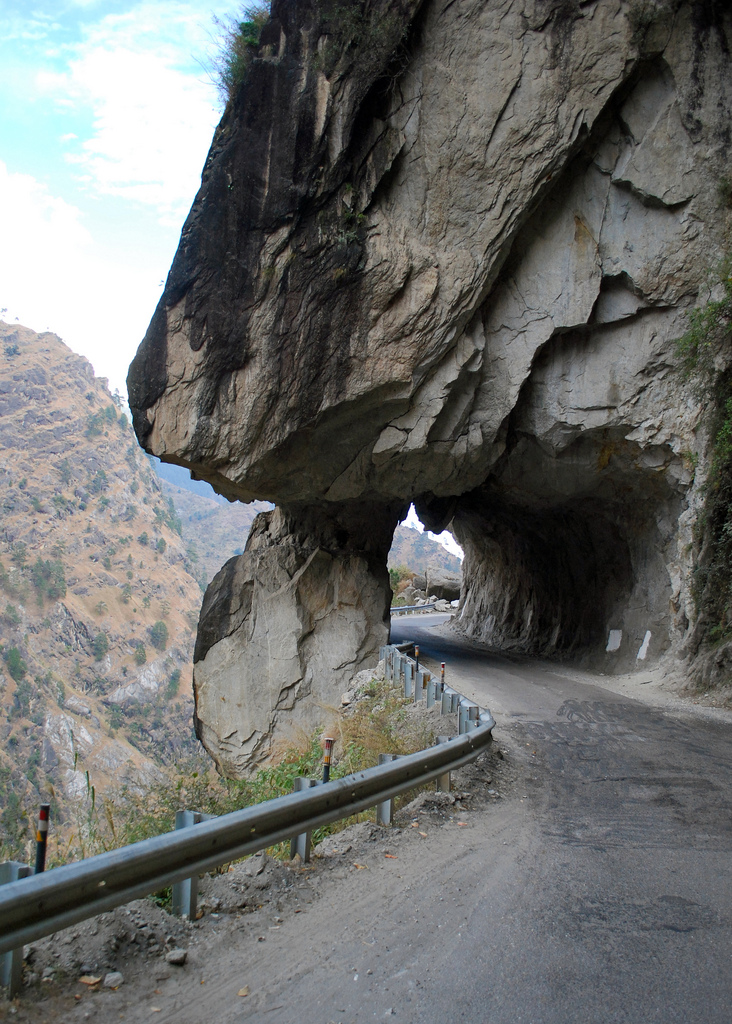
A part of the Hindustan-Tibet Road in Kinnaur.

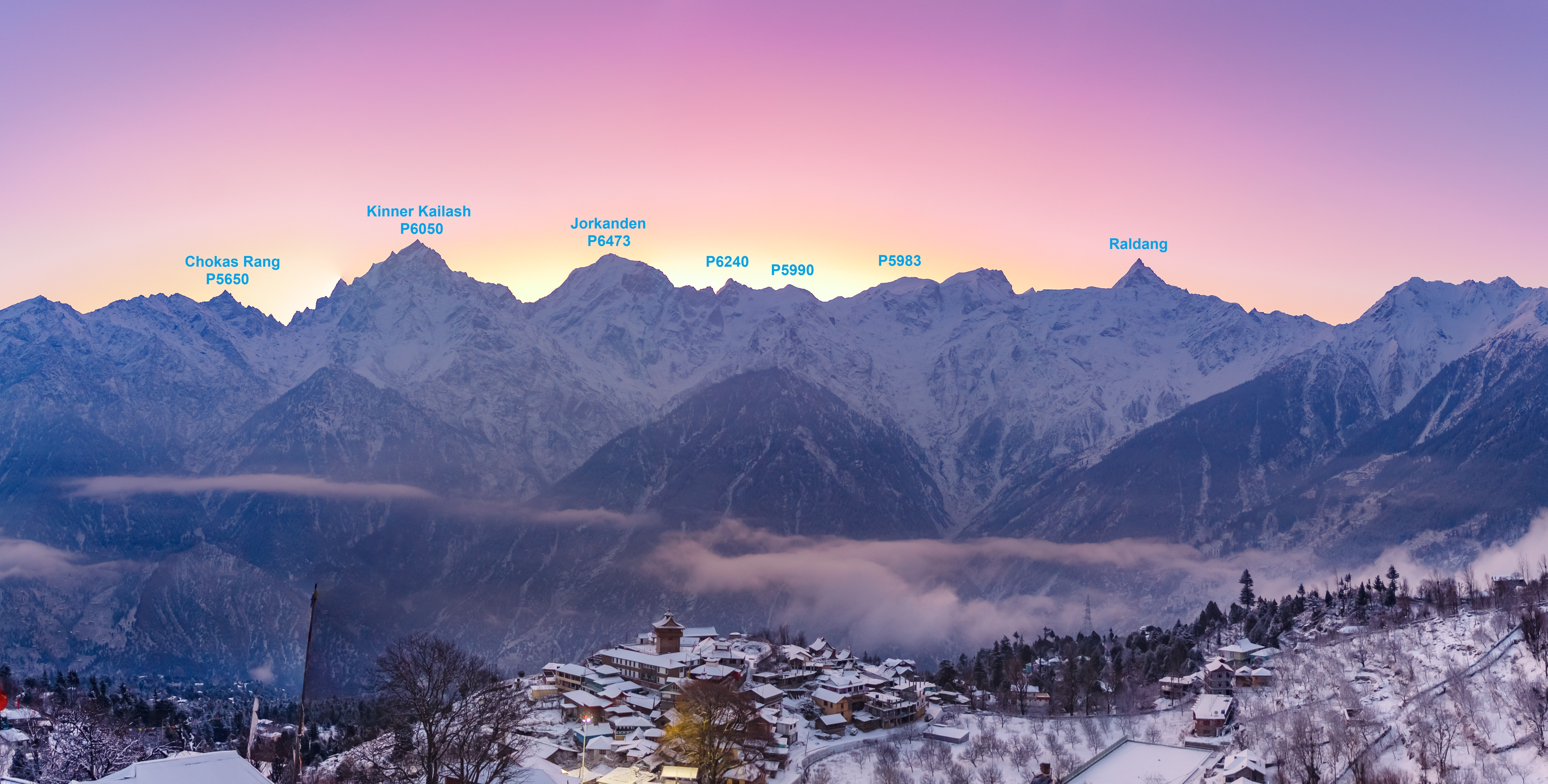
Kinner Kailash mountain range, as seen from Kalpa.

== See also ==
- Kinnauri Nati
- Kinnauri Shawl
- Kinnauri language
- West Himalayish languages (Kinnauri languages)
- Pahari Kinnauri language
- Chitkuli Kinnauri language
- Bhoti Kinnauri
