= Lahuli language =

Lahuli, Lahauli or Lahul Bhoti may be any of several closely related Lahuli–Spiti languages (or "Western Innovative Tibetan"), of the Lahaul and Spiti district, in the state of Himachal Pradesh, India. These include:

- Bhoti Kinnauri also called Nyamkat, or the Nyam language
- Bunan, also known as Lahuli of Bunan, Gahri, Ghara, Punan, Erankad, or Keylong Boli
- Lahul Lohar
- Pattani also called Manchad or Chamba Lahuli
- Spiti Bhoti
- Stod Bhoti, which may also be known as sTodpa, or occasionally as Lahul Bhoti or Lahuli
- Tinani, also known as Tinan Lahuli
- Tukpa, also known as Nesang

== See also ==
- Lahaul and Spiti (disambiguation)
- Bunan (disambiguation)
- Chamba language (disambiguation)
- Ghara (disambiguation)
- Nyam (disambiguation)
