= Nyam =

Nyam may refer to:

- New York Academy of Medicine, a scholarly institution for medical research in New York City
- Nyam language, an Afro-Asiatic language
- Bhoti Kinnauri also called Nyamkat or the Nyam language, a Tibetic (Sino-Tibetan) language of Himachal Pradesh, India

== People with the name ==
Nyam is a Mongolian given name.

- Enkhsaikhany Nyam-Ochir
- Nyam-Osoryn Tuyaa
- Nyam-Osor Naranbold
- Sainjargalyn Nyam-Ochir
- Nyam-Osoryn Uchral

== See also ==
- Nyam Nyam (disambiguation)
- Nyame, the God of the Akan people of Ghana
- Nyame (name)
- Lahuli language (disambiguation), another name of the Nyam language of India
