= Spiti (disambiguation) =

Spiti Valley is a desert mountain valley high in the Himalayas.

Spiti may also refer to:

- Lahaul and Spiti district, a district in the state of Himachal Pradesh in India
- Spiti Horse, a horse breed from Himachal Pradesh
- Spiti language, spoken in Spiti, Himachal Pradesh, India
- Spiti River, in the Spiti Valley, Himachal Pradesh

== See also ==
- Lahaul and Spiti (disambiguation)
