= Lahaul and Spiti =

Lahaul and Spiti may refer to:

- Lahaul and Spiti district, a district in Himachal Pradesh, India
  - Lahaul and Spiti (Vidhan Sabha constituency), the state assembly constituency encompassing the district

== See also ==
- Lahuli language (disambiguation)
- Spiti (disambiguation)
