= Tukpa language =

Tibetic language of India

Tukpa
- Nesang
- Native to: India
- Region: Himachal Pradesh
- Native speakers: (610 cited 2000)
- Language family: Sino-Tibetan: Tibeto-Burman; Tibeto-Kanauri (?); Bodish; Tibetic; Lahuli–Spiti; Tukpa

Language codes
- ISO 639-3: tpq
- Glottolog: tukp1239

Tukpa, also known as Nesang, is a Tibetic language spoken in the Lahaul and Spiti region of Himachal Pradesh, India. It forms a closely knit group with other Lahuli–Spiti languages, and is fairly close to Standard Tibetan.
