= Bunan =

Bunan may be:

- Bunan language, a Tibetic (Sino-Tibetan) language of Himachal Pradesh, India
- Salmawaih ibn Bunan, medieval translator of Greek medical works into Arabic

== See also ==
- Lahuli language (disambiguation)
