= Tayul Monastery =

Buddhist monastery in northern India

- Location within India

Religion
- Affiliation: Tibetan Buddhism
- Sect: Drugpa

Location
- Location: Satingri, Lahul and Spiti, Himachal Pradesh, India
- Country: India
- Interactive map of Tayul Monastery
- Coordinates: 32°33′42″N 77°4′23″E

Architecture
- Founder: Serzang Richen
- Completed: 17th century

Tayul Monastery or Tayul Gompa is a Buddhist monastery in the Bhaga Valley of Lahul and Spiti, Himachal Pradesh, northern India. It is located 6 kilometres from Keylong above the village of Satingri.

== History ==
Tayul gonpa written in Tibetan as Ta - Yul means "chosen place".

The Drugpa (Dogpa) Lama, Serzang Richen of the Kham region of Tibet established the Tayul Monastery in the 17th century.

== Structure ==
The monastery was then constructed and houses a hundred million mani wheel and would apparently turn by itself on special Buddhist occasions.

Tayul has 12 foot statue of Padmasambhava and his two materialisations, Sighmukha and Vijravarashi and is well decorated with elaborate murals. The library contains the Buddhist scriptures, the Kangyur.

It was renovated avbout 100 years after establishment by a Ladakhi Tulku, Tashi Tanphel of Tagna Monastery who renovated it and extended the building.
