= Nyame (name) =

Nyame is both a given name and surname. Notable people with the name include:

- Jayden Antwi-Nyame (born 1998), English footballer
- Jolly Nyame (born 1955), Governor of Taraba State in Nigeria
- Victoria Nyame (died 1980), Ghanaian politician
- Nyame Brown, artist from San Francisco
- Omar Nyame (born 1998), English television personality

== See also ==
- Nyam (disambiguation)
