= Nyamnyam =

Nyamnyam may refer to:

- An alternate name of the Nizaa language
- Nyamnyam, publisher of videogame Astrologaster

== See also ==
- Nyam Nyam
