= Shashur Monastery =

Tibetan Buddhist monastery in northern India

- Location within India

Religion
- Affiliation: Tibetan Buddhism
- Sect: Drugpa

Location
- Location: Lahaul and Spiti, Himachal Pradesh, India
- Country: India
- Interactive map of Shashur Monastery
- Coordinates: 32°34′45″N 77°1′32″E

Architecture
- Founder: Lama Deva Gyatsho
- Completed: 17th century

Shashur Monastery (locally known as 'Shashur gonpa') is a Tibetan Buddhist monastery of the Drugpa sect in Lahaul valley, Lahaul and Spiti district, Himachal Pradesh, northern India. It is located 3 km away from Kyelang, the district headquarters. In the local dialect, the word 'shashur' means 'amidst blue pines', and refers to the location of this monastery on a pine-covered mountain. The monastery was established by a lama from Ladakh called Dawa Gyatsho in the 17th century. The monastery is known for its annual Tseshe festival, held between June and July.

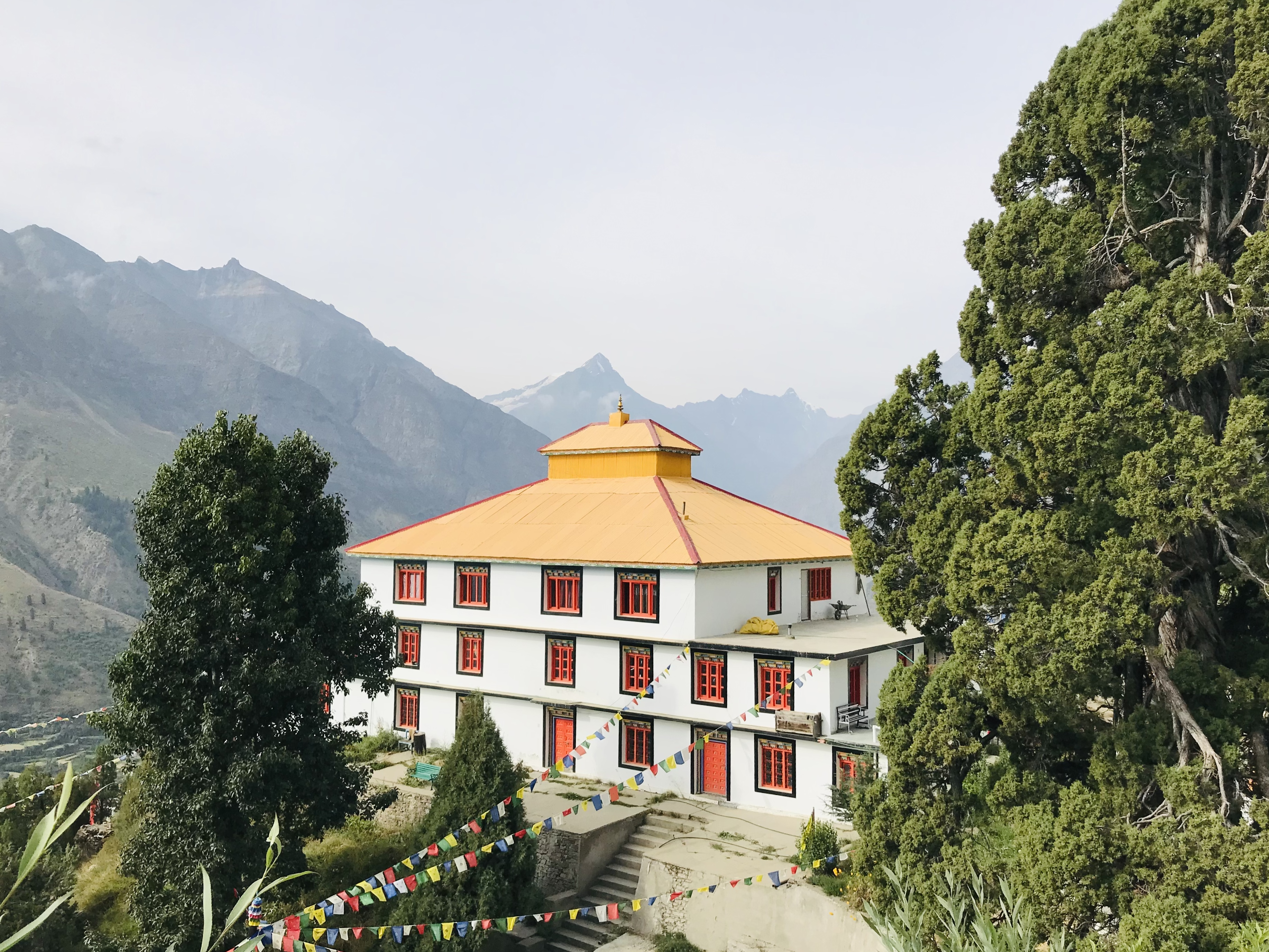
Shashur monastery, Lahaul.
