= Stod Bhoti =

Tibetic language

- སྟོད་པ་sTodpa
- Native to: India
- Region: Himachal Pradesh
- Native speakers: (2,500 cited 1996)
- Language family: Sino-Tibetan: Tibeto-Burman; Tibeto-Kanauri (?); Bodish; Tibetic; Lahuli–Spiti; Stod Bhoti

Language codes
- ISO 639-3: sbu
- Glottolog: stod1241

Stod Bhoti (sTodpa), occasionally known as Lahul Bhoti or Lahuli, is a Tibetic language spoken in the Lahaul and Spiti district of Himachal Pradesh, India. It forms a closely knit group with other Lahuli–Spiti languages, and is fairly close to Standard Tibetan.

According to Ethnologue, dialects are Stod proper (Kolong), Khoksar (i.e. Khoksar Bhoti) and Mayar (Mayar Bhoti, or Mayari). They report 85% intelligibility of the Stod dialect by Khoksar, 75% by Mayar, 62% of Khoksar by Mayar, and 95% of Khoksar by Stod Bhoti. There is a 74% lexical similarity with the related language Spiti Bhoti.

== History ==
The language was first studied after the foundation of a Moravian Church mission office in 1854. In 1881, H.A. Jaeschke published a Tibetan–English dictionary that included a comparative table of words from different languages spoken in the region, including Stod Bhoti, but without explicitly mentioning the name of the language.

In 1934, Roerich studied this language extensively, naming it 'Kolong' after its chief village.

The People's Linguistic Survey of India (PLSI) identified two prominent features of the language: a distinct tone and simplification of compound consonants. A grammar book has also been published.
