= Lahuli–Spiti languages =

Subgroup of closely related Tibetic languages

Lahuli–Spiti
- Western Innovative Tibetan
- Geographic distribution: Himachal Pradesh, Uttarakhand
- Linguistic classification: Sino-Tibetan: Tibeto-Burman; Tibeto-Kanauri (?); Bodish; Tibetic; Lahuli–Spiti

Language codes
- Glottolog: laha1255

The Lahuli–Spiti languages the exonym for a subgroup of the Tibetic languages related to the (Stöd) Ngari Tibetan spoken in the Lahaul and Spiti region of Himachal Pradesh, India, belonging to the South-Western group of Tibetic languages, earlier classified as Western Innovative Tibetan. They are more closely related to Standard Tibetan than to the neighboring Ladakhi–Balti languages spoken further north.

According to Tournadre (2014), the Lahuli–Spiti languages include:

- Lahuli (Stod Bhoti)
- Spiti
- Nyamkat
- Bhoti Kinnauri
- Tukpa (Nesang)

Also, Jad spoken in Uttarakhand is closely related to Spiti.
