= Nyam Nyam =

Nyam Nyam may refer to:

- Nyam Nyam (band), a 1980s post-punk band from Hull, England
- a derogatory stereotype of the Central African interior that came to be associated with the Azande people in the mid-19th century (see Azande Kingdom#Historiography)
- Tiny Teddy biscuits or Nyam-Nyam Teddy
- Nyam Nyam, a clasp on the Khedive's Sudan Medal

== See also ==
- Nyamnyam
