= Bhoti Kinnauri =

Tibetic language of India

- Native to: India
- Region: Himachal Pradesh
- Native speakers: (6,800 cited 2000)
- Language family: Sino-Tibetan: Tibeto-Burman; Tibeto-Kanauri (?); Bodish; Tibetic; Lahuli–Spiti; Bhoti Kinnauri

Language codes
- ISO 639-3: nes
- Glottolog: bhot1235

Bhoti Kinnauri (or Nyamkat, or the Nyam language) is a Tibetic language spoken in the Lahaul and Spiti region of Himachal Pradesh, India. It forms a closely knit group with other Lahuli–Spiti languages, and is fairly close to Standard Tibetan.

== See also ==
- Bodh people

== Bibliography ==
- Sharma, D. D. (1992), "Nyamkad (Nyam-kat)", Tribal Languages of Himachal Pradesh: Part Two, New Delhi: Mittal Publications, pp. 97–196
- Saxena, Anju (2022), "A Linguistic Sketch of Navakat", The linguistic landscape of the Indian Himalayas: Languages in Kinnaur, Leiden: Brill, pp. 169–271
