= Lahaul and Spiti district =

District in Himachal Pradesh, India

- District of Himachal Pradesh
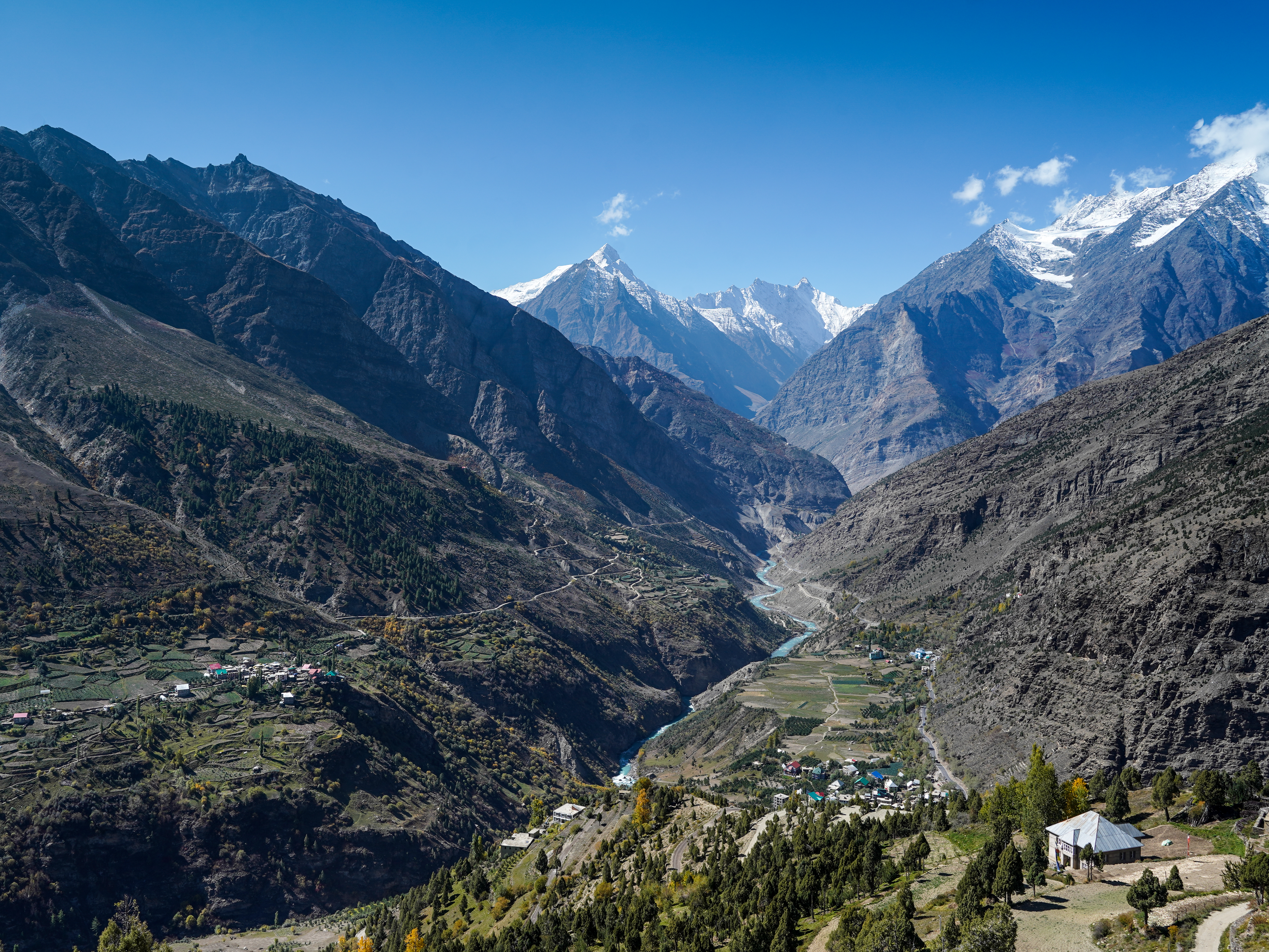
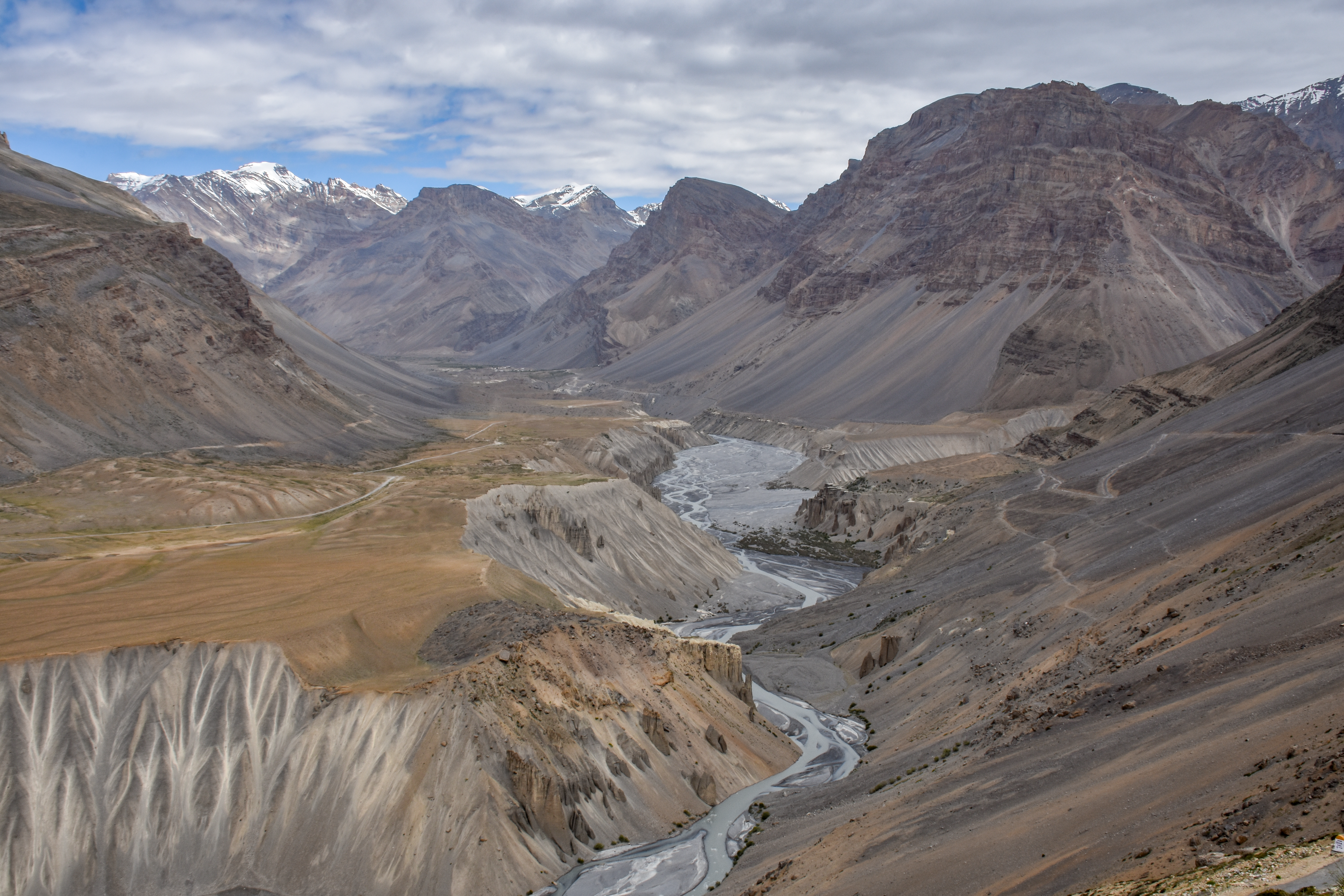
- Bhaga valley in Lahaul (top); Spiti valley near Losar (bottom)
- Interactive map of Lahaul and Spiti district
- Coordinates (Keylong): 32°30′N 77°36′E
- Country: India
- State: Himachal Pradesh
- Headquarters: Keylong

Government
  - Vidhan Sabha constituencies: 01

Area
  - Total: 13,833 km^{2} (5,341 sq mi)

Population (2011)
  - Total: 31,564
  - Density: 2.2818/km^{2} (5.9098/sq mi)
  - Urban: None

Demographics
  - Literacy: 86.97% (male), 66.5% (female)
  - Sex ratio: 916

Languages
  - Official: Hindi
  - Native: Lahuli–Spiti languages
- Time zone: UTC+05:30 (IST)
- Vehicle registration: HP-41, HP-42, HP-43
- Major highways: one (Manali-Leh National Highway)
- Average annual precipitation: Scanty rainfall
- Website: https://hplahaulspiti.gov.in

Lahaul and Spiti district is a high-altitude district in Himachal Pradesh, north India. This entirely mountainous district consists of two geographically distinct as well as formerly separate political-administrative units, called Lahaul and Spiti. Lahaul and Spiti is the largest district by area in Himachal Pradesh, and one of the least populous districts in the whole of India. Kyelang (also spelled as 'Keylong') in Lahaul is the headquarters of the whole district, while Spiti also has a subdivisional headquarters, at Kaza.

Lahaul and Spiti is fast becoming a top weekend getaway destination in Himachal, due to improved road access via Atal Tunnel and rising investment in resorts and adventure activities.

== Geography ==
=== Physical ===
Kunzum Pass or the Kunzum la (altitude 4,551 m (14,931 ft)), 21 km (13 miles) from Chandra Tal, connects the Lahaul Valley in the west to the Spiti Valley in the east.

Lahaul (in the west, with Keylong as the main city): Geologically located in the Himalayas and the Tibetan Plateau, Lahaul is connected to Manali in the south through the Rohtang Pass. Lahaul has three valleys from east to west, the Chandra Valley (locally known as Rangloi Valley) after the east-to-west flowing Chandra River, the Bhaga Valley (locally known as Ghar Valley) after the north-to-south flowing Bhaga River, and the Chandra-Bhaga Valley (locally known as Pattan Valley, and further on as Chenab Valley) east-to-west flowing Chandra-Bhaga River. The confluence of the Chandra and the Bhaga rivers is at Tandi, where is becomes Chandra-Bhaga River. The average elevation of Spiti is significantly greater than that of Lahaul. Lahaul receives much more rainfall than Spiti.

Spiti (in the east, with Kaza as the main town): To the south, Spiti ends 24 km (15 miles) from Tabo, at the Sumdo where the road enters Kinnaur and joins National Highway 5. Spiti is barren and difficult to cross, with an average elevation of the valley floor of 4,270 m (14,010 ft). It is surrounded by lofty ranges, with the Spiti River rushing out of a gorge in the southeast to meet the Sutlej River. It is a typical mountain desert area with an average annual rainfall of only 170 mm (6.7 in). The Spiti Valley, which follows the course of Sutlej's tributary west-to-east flowing Spiti river for about 150 km, is traditionally divided into four main regions or sub-valleys: Tud (the higher region from Kunzum Pass down to the Spiti River's confluence with Lingti River through high-altitude villages like Losar, Hansa, and Kyoto), Bhar (the middle region, with the sub-divisional headquarters at Kaza), Sham (the lower region, with the ancient capital Dhankar and Tabo being the main habitations), the Pin Valley formed by the Pin River famous for the Pin Valley National Park. Notable side-valleys are the Mulang Valley (to the east of Bara-lacha la between the drainage basins of the Chandra and Spiti rivers), to the west and north of Kaza is Lingti River Valley (60 km, the longest, often described as a "living geological museum" due to its abundance of shale and fossils dating back 250 million years), the Parahio River Valley is western tributary of Pin River with Dhar Thango being an important village.

=== Administrative ===
Lahaul and Spiti district borders the districts of Kullu, Kangra, and Chamba to the south; Chamba to the west; Jammu and Kashmir and Ladakh union territories to the north; Tibet to the east, and Kinnaur district to the southeast.

Lahaul and Spiti district is subdivided into 3 sub-divisions (Keylong, Kaza, and Udaipur), 2 tehsils (Lahaul headquartered at Keylong and Spiti headquartered at Kaza), 1 sub-tehsil at Udaipur under the Lahaul tehsil, 2 community development blocks (Lahaul at Keylong and Spiti at Kaza), 41 gram panchayat (28 in Lahaul and 13 in Spiti).

== History ==
=== Lahaul ===
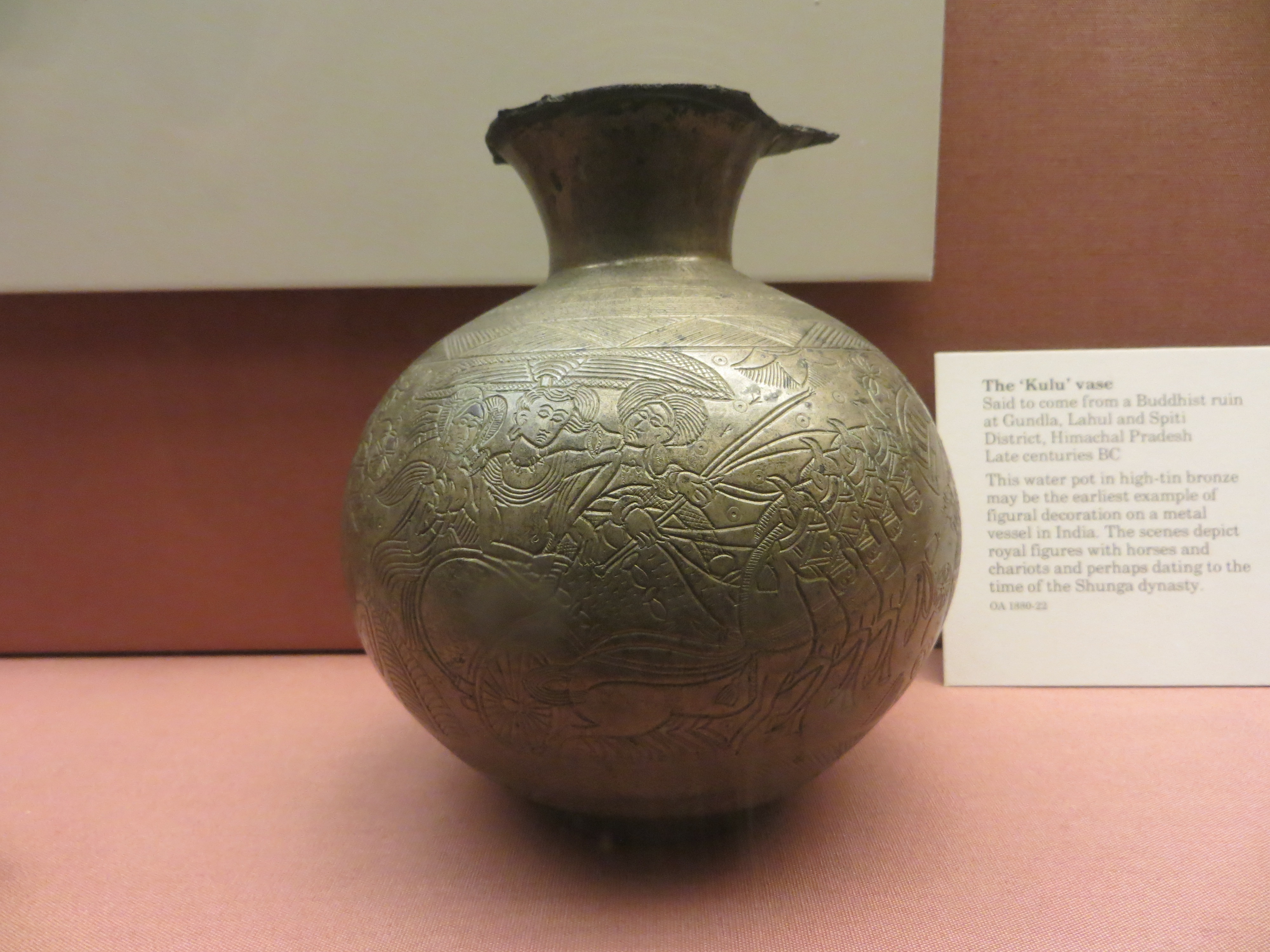
The 'Kulu Vase', dating to the first century B.C., which was found near Gondhla monastery in the mid-19th century.

==== Pre-modern and early modern ====
Lahaul was under the influence of the kingdom of Ladakh until the early 17th century. But the rulers of Chamba and Kullu also vied for control over Lahaul in that period. In the 17th century, Lahaul came under the influence of the Rajas of Kullu, particularly under the reign of Raja Biddhi Singh (r. 1672-1688) and his successor Raja Man Singh (r. 1688-1719). In the early 19th century, Dogra forces captured Lahaul. After the Anglo-Sikh War of 1845-46, Lahaul came under the rule of the British Raj.

==== Colonial period ====
Under British rule, Lahaul was made into a 'waziri' of the Kullu sub-division of the Kangra district of the Punjab Province. At that time, Lahaul had three 'jagir kothis' that pre-dated British rule: Kolong, Gumrang, and Gondhla. The heads of these 'kothis' (revenue districts) were hereditary 'jagirdars', and held the title of 'Thakur'. The Thakur of the Kolong kothi was made the wazir for the whole of Lahaul by the British. M.S. Gill remarks that the wazir was a magistrate, police officer, jailer, revenue collector, and forest officer all rolled into one.

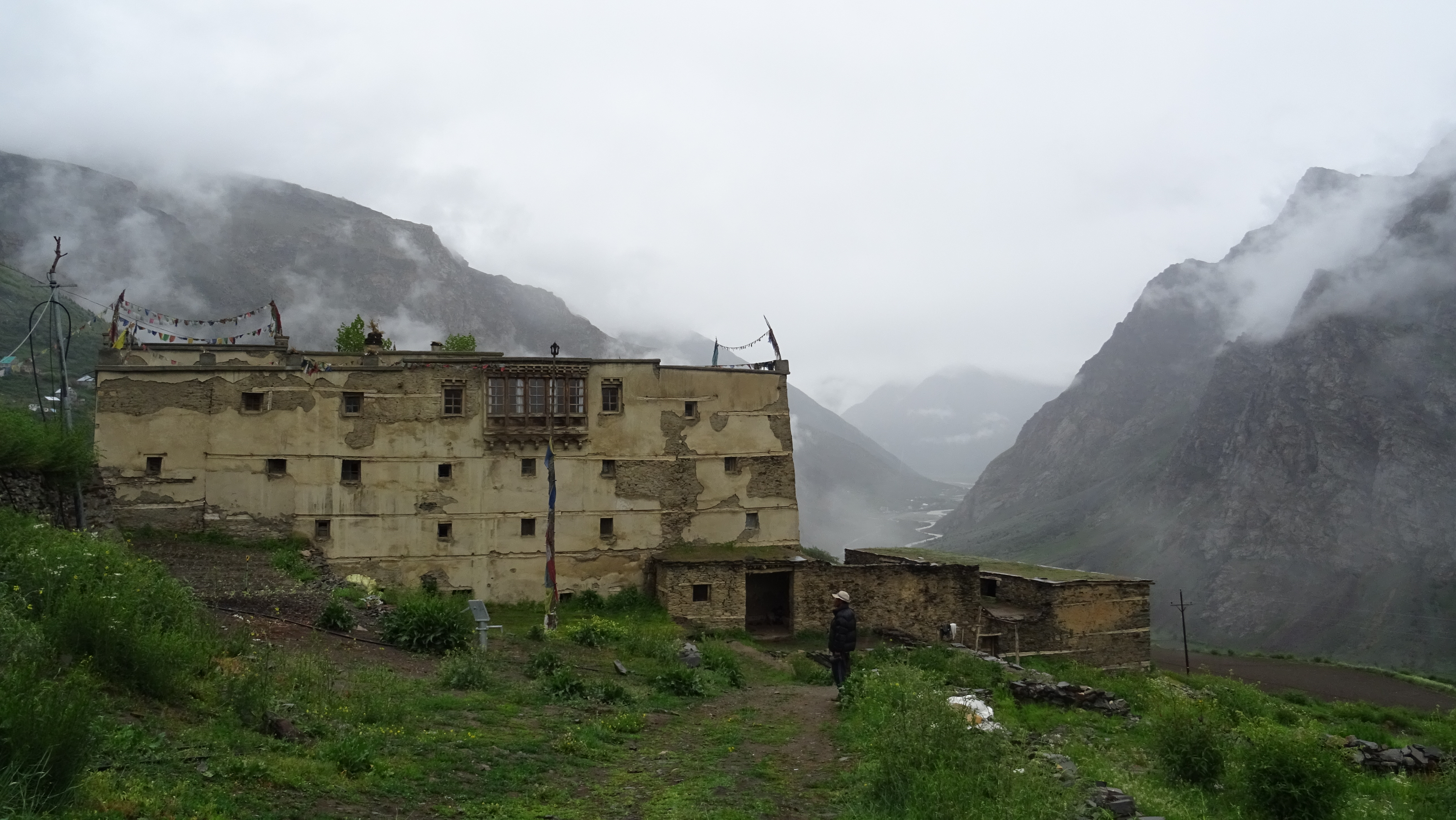
Khangsar palace, the seat of the Thakurs of Kolong.

The first Thakur of Kolong to be given the designation of the 'Wazir of Lahaul' was Thakur Hari Chand, who held this post from 1877 until his death in 1900. The second Wazir of Lahaul was Thakur Amar Chand, who held this post over 1900-1921. He was the son of Thakur Hari Chand. Amar Chand was bestowed with the title of 'Rai Bahadur' by the British for his contributions to the British war effort in the First World War. The third Wazir of Lahaul was Thakur Mangal Chand (1886-1969). He was the younger brother of Thakur Amar Chand. Thakur Mangal Chand was the Wazir of Lahaul from 1921 until the time Thakur Pratap Chand (his nephew and a son of Thakur Amar Chand) achieved maturity. By the 1930s, Thakur Pratap Chand had become the fourth Wazir of Lahaul, and he would be the last.

Some sources note that the waziri was abolished in 1941. Lahaul and Spiti were then combined to form a sub-tehsil of the Kullu sub-division, and Lahaul was now administered by a Naib Tehsildar posted at Kyelang. However, Gill notes that the wazir was not formally displaced; only his powers were reduced. Overall, this system involving the Naib Tehsildar and the Wazir continued till 1960, when Lahaul and Spiti were combined to create the Lahaul and Spiti district.

Alongside agriculture and pastoralism, trade was an important occupation for Lahulis in the pre-Independence days. Alexander Diack noted in the late 19th century that at least one-third of the proprietors in Lahaul were engaged in trade. A major Central Asian trade route passed through Lahaul, connecting the plains of Punjab and the Kullu valley with Ladakh and Yarkand. Patseo, near Darcha (the last village in northern Lahaul) used to be the site of an important annual wool mart in the colonial period. It used to witness participation from traders and herders from Lahaul, Changthang, Tibet, Zangskar, Spiti, and Kullu, alongside Khampas and Gaddis. Many Lahauli would also annually go to Western Tibet to buy wool and pashmina for cash.

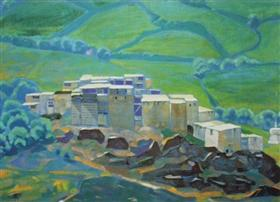
Kardang village of Lahaul, as painted by Nicholas Roerich in 1932.

During the colonial period, Keylong had a Moravian mission, which ran from 1853 to 1940. Famous missionaries who served in Keylong included Heinrich August Jäschke, August Wilhelm Heyde, and August Hermann Francke. The Moravian missionaries did not have much success in building a Christian congregation in Lahaul. But they are remembered for introducing several crops (including potatoes, turnips, lettuce, spinach, and cauliflower), the practice of knitting, newspapers, kerosene stoves, and flue pipes to Lahaul.

==== Early postcolonial period ====
During the Indo-Pakistani War of 1947-48, three Indian Army officers from Lahaul, Thakur Prithi Chand, Kushal Chand, and Bhim Chand, who were all relatives, played major roles in defending neighbouring Ladakh from Pakistani forces.

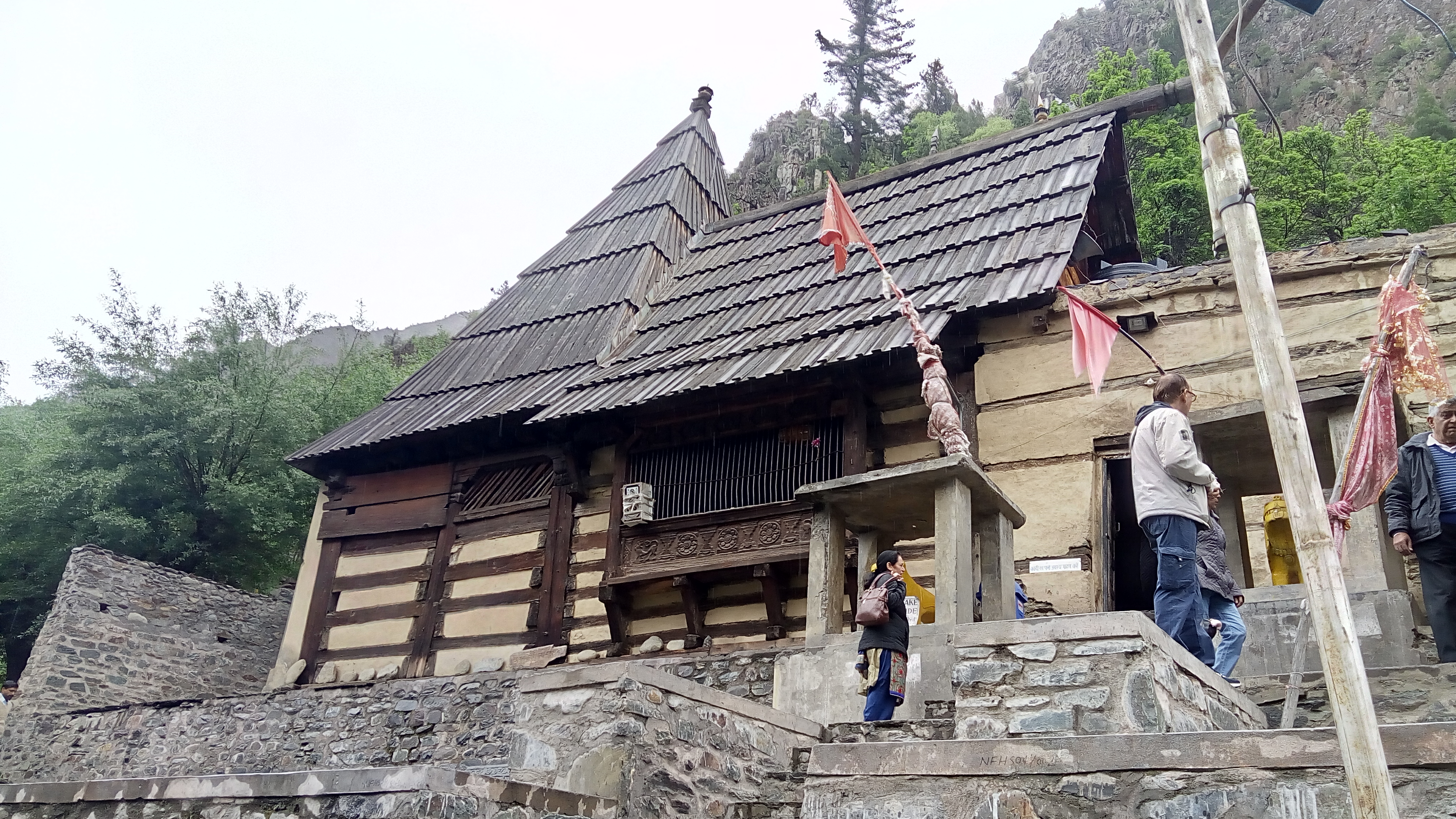
Mrikula Devi Temple at Udaipur

==== Historical sites ====
Some historical sites in Lahaul include the monastery and fort at Gondhla, Triloknath temple, Shashur monastery, Khangsar palace, and Mrikula Devi temple.

=== Spiti ===
[For the history of Spiti, see the article on Spiti.]

=== Lahaul and Spiti district ===
In 1960, Lahaul and Spiti were carved out and combined to create a new district, Lahaul and Spiti. In 1966, this district became a part of the then emerging state of Himachal Pradesh.

In 1972, Lata Thakur from Lahaul became the first-ever female Scheduled Tribe MLA in the Himachal Pradesh Government.

== Flora and fauna ==
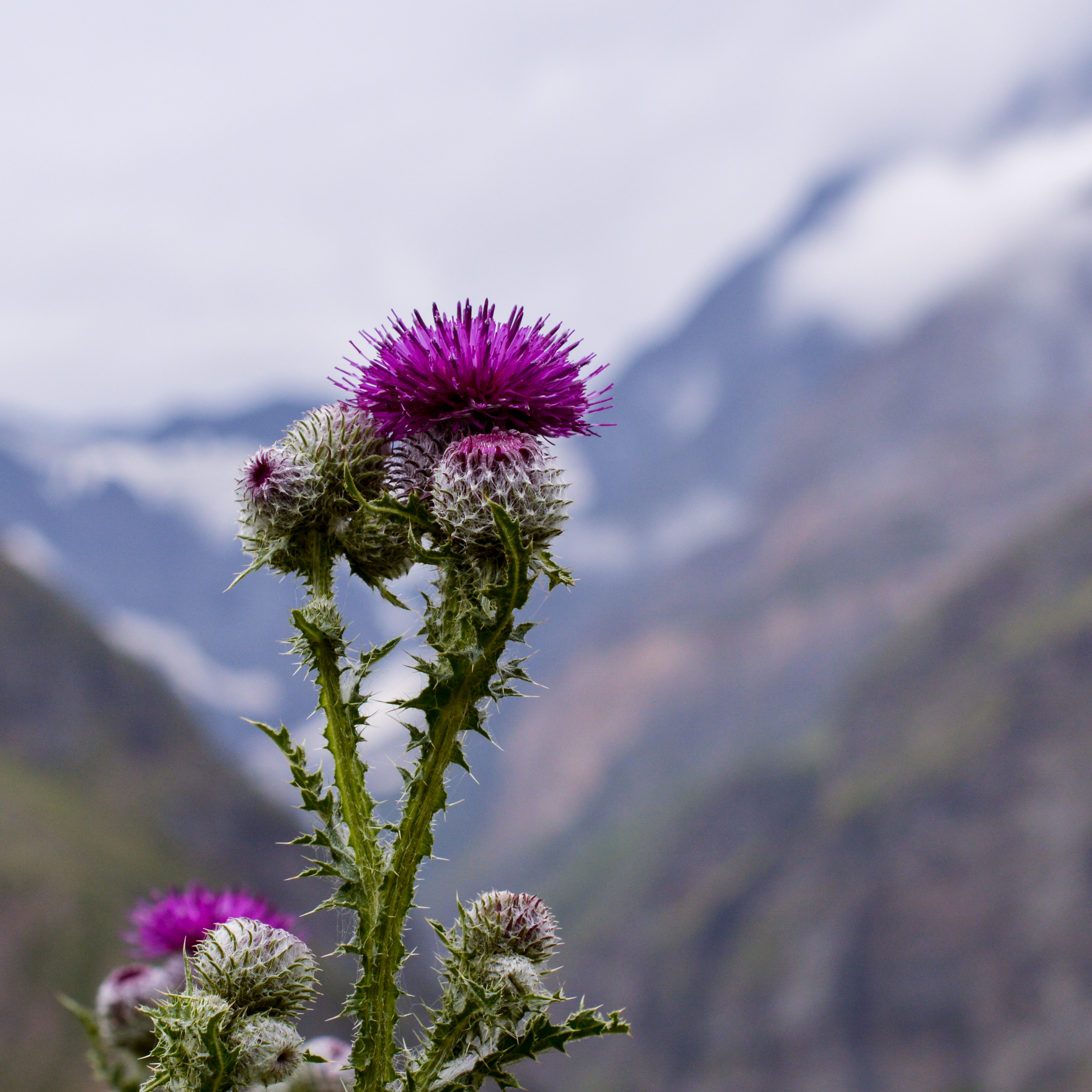
Cousinia thomsonii (Thomson thistle), Sissu, Lahaul

The harsh conditions of Lahaul permit only scattered tufts of hardy grasses and shrubs to grow, even below 4 km (13,000 ft). Glacier lines are usually found at 5 km (16,000 ft). Due to changes in climate, people in the Lahaul valley are able to grow some vegetables like cabbages, potatoes, green peas, radishes, tomatoes, carrots and leafy vegetables. The main cash crops are potatoes, cabbages, and green peas.

Some of the most common species of flora found in the Valley of Spiti include Cousinia thomsonii, Seseli trilobum, Crepis flexuosa, Caragana brevifolia and Krascheninnikovia ceratoides. There are over 62 species of medicinal plants found there as well. Several species of juniper grow in the valley, noted for their adaptation to the cold desert climate conditions. They are used by local people for religious purposes and for subsistence. The juniper forests are threatened by overuse and habitat degradation. The valley is inhabited by snow leopards, foxes, ibex, Himalayan brown bear, musk deer, and Himalayan blue sheep. Snow leopards are protected within the Pin Valley National Park and Kibber Wildlife Sanctuary. The Lingti plains are home to animals such as yaks and dzos.

Over-hunting and a decrease in food supplies have led to a large reduction in the population of the Tibetan antelope, argali, kiangs, musk deer, and snow leopards in these regions, reducing them to the status of endangered species. The locals of Spiti do not hunt these wild animals due to their religious beliefs.

=== Kibber Wildlife Sanctuary ===
Kibber Wildlife Sanctuary is the largest wildlife sanctuary in Himachal Pradesh. It is situated at an altitude of 3600m to 6700m, on the left bank of the Spiti River in the district of Lahaul and Spiti. It is sprawled over an area of 2220.12sq km. This cold desert area sanctuary was declared a wildlife sanctuary in 1992. The fauna of Kibber Wildlife Sanctuary includes ibex, snow leopard, blue sheep, and birds such as snow cock, griffons, and bearded eagle. The flora consists of Monkshood, Somlata, Pink Arnebia, Orchid, and Gentian.

== People ==
=== Demographics ===
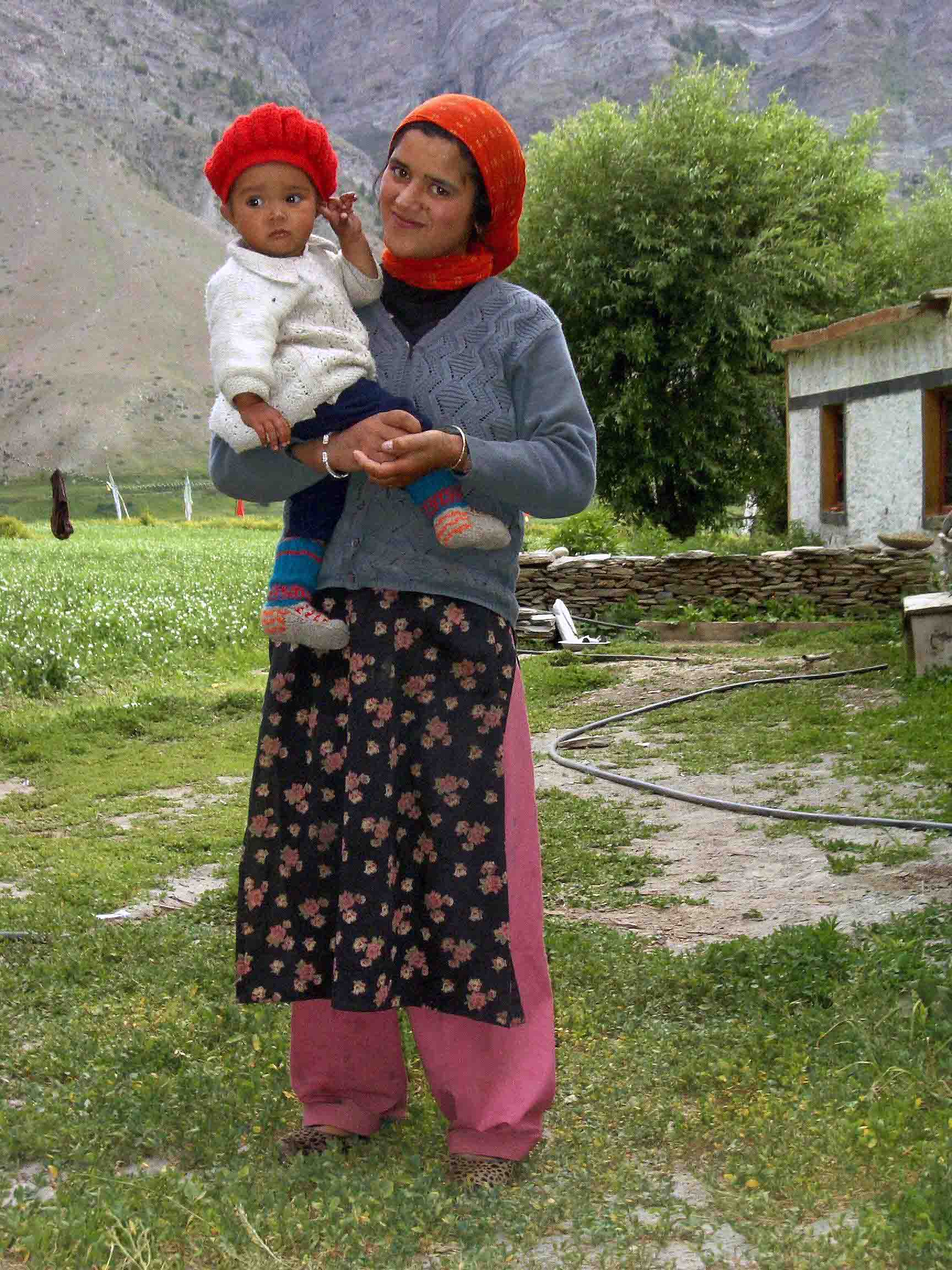
Mother and child near Gandhola Monastery, 2004

According to the 2011 census, the Lahaul and Spiti district has a population of 31,564. This gives it a ranking of 638th in India (out of a total of 640). The district has a population density of 2 inhabitants per square kilometre (5.2/sq mi). Its population growth rate over the decade 2001-2011 was -5%. Lahul and Spiti has a sex ratio of 903 females for every 1000 males, and a literacy rate of 76.81%. The entire population is rural. Scheduled Castes and Scheduled Tribes make up 7.08% and 81.44% of the population respectively.

Languages of Lahaul and Spiti district (2011)
1. Kinnauri (40.9%)
2. Pattani (26.5%)
3. Bhotia (2.99%)
4. Hindi (2.86%)
5. Nepali (2.82%)
6. Tibetan (2.57%)
7. Kurukh (2.40%)
8. Pahari (1.97%)
9. Mahili (1.49%)
10. Halam (1.20%)
11. Others (14.3%)

=== Languages ===
41% of the population speaks Kinnauri, 27% Pattani, 3.0% Bhotia, 2.9% Hindi, 2.8% Nepali and 2.6% Tibetan as their first language. These figures can largely be attributed to the Pattan Valley having a higher population density than the Lahauli and Spiti (Bhotia) areas and an influx of Kinnauri migrant labour and staff working on developmental projects from the neighbouring district in 2011.

The language, culture, and populations of Lahaul and Spiti are closely related. Generally, the Lahaulis are of Tibetan and Indo-Aryan descent, while the Spiti Bhot is closer to the Tibetans, owing to their proximity to Tibet. The district has a Himachal Pradesh state legislative law in place to curb antique looting by travelers, given past incidents. In the pre-independence era, the ethnic tribal belt was divided into the British Lahaul and the Chamba Lahaul, which was merged with Punjab post-1947. This is the second-largest district in the Indian union.

The language spoken by both the Lahauli and Spiti Bhots is Bhoti, a Tibetic language of the Western Innovative subgroup. They are very similar to the Ladakh and Tibetans culturally, as they had been placed under the rule of the Guge and Ladakh kingdoms at occasional intervals.

=== Culture ===
Among the Lahaulis, the family acts as the basic unit of kinship. The extended family system is common and evolved from the polyandric system of the past. The family is headed by a senior male member, known as the Yunda, while his wife, known as the Yundamo, attains authority by being the oldest member of the generation. The clan system, also known as Rhus, plays another major role in the Lahauli society.

The Spiti Bhot community has an inheritance system that is otherwise unique to the Tibetans. Upon the death of both parents, only the eldest son will inherit the family property, while the eldest daughter inherits the mother's jewelry, and the younger siblings inherit nothing. Men usually fall back on the social security system of the Trans-Himalayan Gompas.

The district has close cultural links with Ngari Prefecture of Tibet Autonomous Region.

Historical population
| Year | Pop. | ±% p.a. |
|---|---|---|
| 1901 | 12,392 | — |
| 1911 | 12,981 | +0.47% |
| 1921 | 12,836 | −0.11% |
| 1931 | 13,733 | +0.68% |
| 1941 | 14,594 | +0.61% |
| 1951 | 15,338 | +0.50% |
| 1961 | 23,682 | +4.44% |
| 1971 | 27,568 | +1.53% |
| 1981 | 32,100 | +1.53% |
| 1991 | 31,294 | −0.25% |
| 2001 | 33,224 | +0.60% |
| 2011 | 31,564 | −0.51% |

=== Lifestyle ===
The lifestyles of the Lahauli and Spiti Bhot are similar, owing to their proximity. Polyandry was widely practised by the Lahaulis in the past, although this practice has been dying out. The Spiti Bhot does not generally practice polyandry anymore, although it is accepted in a few isolated regions.

Divorces are accomplished by a simple ceremony performed in the presence of village elders. Divorce can be sought by either partner. The husband has to pay compensation to his ex-wife if she does not remarry. However, this is uncommon among the Lahaulis.

Agriculture is the main source of livelihood. Potato farming is common. Occupations include animal husbandry, working in government programs and services, and other businesses and crafts that include weaving. Houses are constructed in the Tibetan architectural style, as the land in Lahul and Spiti is mountainous and quite prone to earthquakes.

== Religion ==
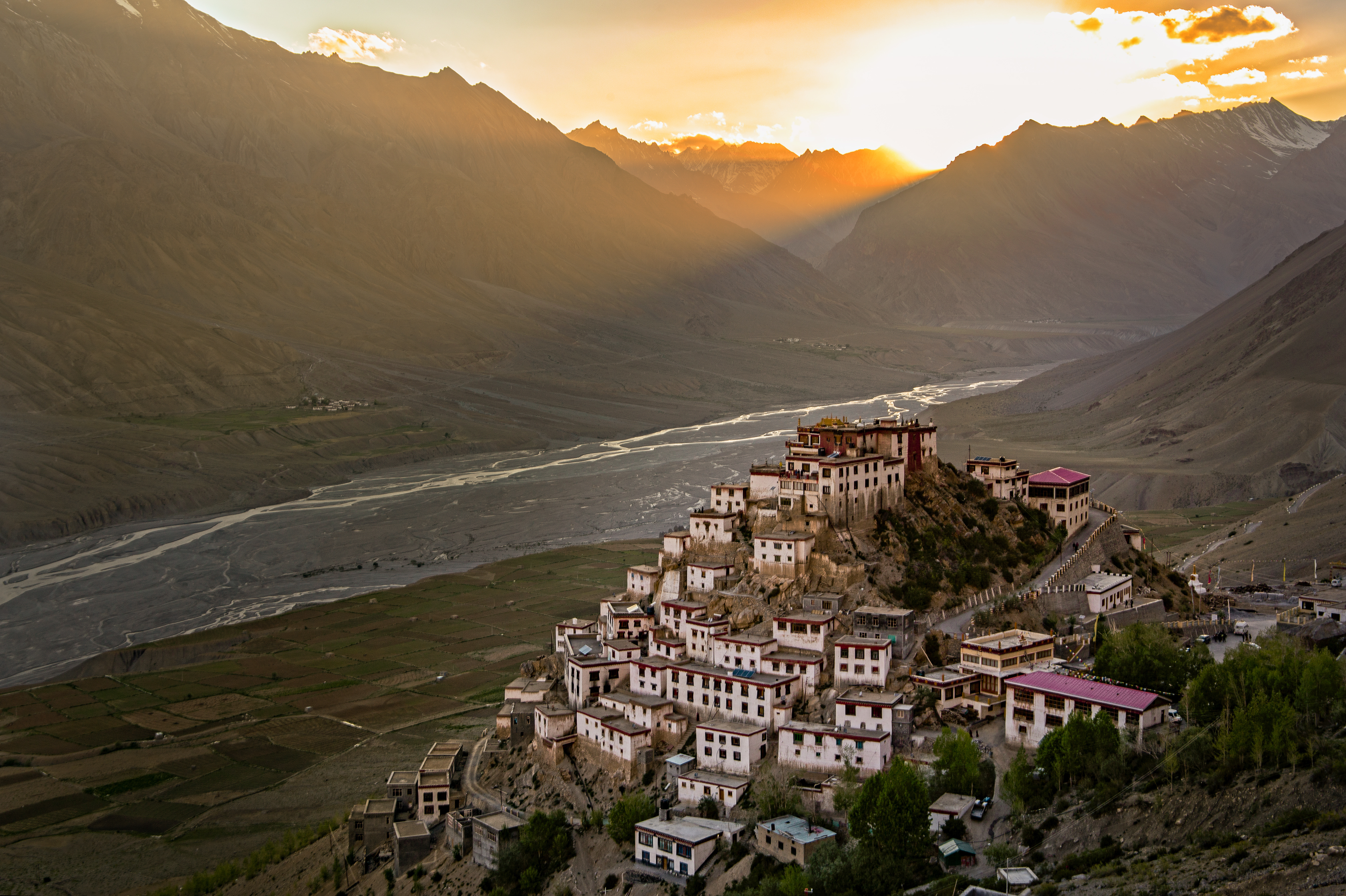
Ki-Gompa overlooking the Spiti River, Spiti

Religions in Lahaul and Spiti district (2011)
| Religion | Percent |
| Buddhism | 62.01% |
| Hinduism | 36.91% |
| Christianity | 0.67% |
| Other or not stated | 0.41% |
Distribution of religions

| Block | Buddhist | Hindu | Other |
|---|---|---|---|
| Lahul | 6,895 | 3,225 | 98 |
| Spiti | 10,978 | 1257 | 222 |
| Udaypur | 1,699 | 7,167 | 23 |

Most of the Lahaulis follow a combination of Hinduism and Tibetan Buddhism of the Drukpa Kagyu order, while the Spiti Bhotia follow Tibetan Buddhism of the Gelugpa order. Within Lahaul, the Todh-Gahr (upper region of Lahaul towards Ladakh) region had the strongest Buddhist influence, owing to its close proximity to Spiti.

Before the spread of Tibetan Buddhism and Hinduism, the people were adherents of the religion 'Lung Pe Chhoi', an animistic religion that had some affinities with the Bön religion of Tibet. While the religion flourished, animal and human sacrifices were regularly offered up to the 'Iha', a term that refers to evil spirits residing in the natural world, notably in the old pencil-cedar trees, rocks, and caves. Vestiges of the Lung Pe Chhoi religion can be seen in the behavior of the Lamas, who are believed to possess certain supernatural powers.

The Losar festival (also known as Halda in Lahauli) is celebrated between the months of January and February. The date of the celebration is decided by the Lamas. It has the same significance as the Diwali festival of Hinduism, but is celebrated in a Tibetan fashion.

At the start of the festival, two or three persons from every household will walk in the procession holding burning incense. The burning sticks are then piled into a bonfire. The people will then pray to Shiskar Apa, the goddess of wealth (another name Vasudhara) in the Buddhist religion.

=== Buddhist monasteries ===
Spiti is one of the important centers of Buddhism in Himachal Pradesh. It is popularly known as the 'land of lamas'. The valley is dotted by numerous Buddhist Monasteries or Gompas. These are some of the important monasteries in the Lahul and Spiti valleys.

Kye Monastery: Kye Monastery is one of the main learning centers of Buddhist studies in Spiti. The monastery is home to some 100-odd monks who receive their education here. It is the oldest and biggest monastery in Spiti. It houses rare paintings and scriptures of Buddha and other gods and goddesses. There are also rare 'Thangka' paintings and ancient musical instruments 'like trumpets, cymbals, and drums in the monastery.

Tabo Monastery: Perched at an altitude of 3050 meters, Tabo Monastery is often referred to as the 'Ajanta of the Himalayas'. It is located 45 km from Kaza, Himachal Pradesh, the capital of the Spiti region. This monastery garnered interest when it celebrated its thousandth year of existence in 1996. The Tabo Monastery was founded by scholar Richen Zangpo. The monastery houses more than 60 lamas and contains a collection of rare scriptures, pieces of art, and wall paintings - Thankas, and Stucco. There is a modern guest house with a dining hall and amenities.

Kardang Monastery: Kardang Monastery, is located at an elevation of 3,500 meters across the river, about 8 km from Keylong. Kardang is well connected by the road via the Tandi bridge which is about 14 km from Keylong. Built-in the 12th century, this monastery houses a large library of Buddhist literature including the main Kangyur and Tangyur scriptures.

Tnagyud Gompa: Built during the early decade of 14th century, Tnagyud Gompa is of historical importance and belongs to the Sa-kya-pa sect.

Kungri Gompa: This is the second oldest monastery of Spiti, and is located in Pin valley.

== Tourism ==
The dangerous weather in Lahaul and Spiti permits visitors only between the months of June to October when the roads and villages are free of snow and the high passes (Rothang La and Kunzum La) are open. It is possible to access Spiti from Kinnaur (along the Sutlej) all through the year, although the road is sometimes temporarily closed by landslides or avalanches.

=== Adventure tourism ===
To-do-Trails: The Spiti Valley is popular with trekkers due to the challenging nature of its treks. These treks take people to remote areas including rural villages and old Gompas, as well as wildlife trails. High-altitude treks allow travelers to cross passes such as Parangla Pass (connecting Ladakh with Spiti Valley), Pin Parvati Pass, Baba Pass, Hamta Pass trek, and Spiti Left Bank Trek. Popular trekking routes in the area include Kaza-Langza-Hikim-Komic-Kaza, Kaza-Ki-Kibber-Gete-Kaza, Kaza-Losar-Kunzum La, and Kaza-Tabo-Sumdo-Nako.

Skiing: Skiing is a popular activity with tourists in Spiti.

Yak Safari: Yak rides are used to see the flora and fauna of the trans-Himalayan desert.

=== Buddhist monasteries ===
Buddha's teaching and Buddhism were formally introduced to Tibet by the kind Songtsen Gampo (r. 618-649 CE) and the Tibetan Buddhism gradually spread to Tibet, Ladakh, Lahaul and Spiti. In 8th century, Padmasambhava (Guru Rimpoche) became instrumental in the spread of Buddhism. The natural scenery and numerous Buddhist monasteries are the main tourist attractions of the region.

- Lahaul
  - Guru Ghantaal Monastery, situated on a cliff near Tupchiling village at the confluence of the rivers Chandra and Bhaga northwest of Rohtang Tunel, was founded by Padmasambhava more than 800 years ago.
  - Gemur Monastery on the Manali-Leh Highway, north of Guru Ghantaal Monastery.
  - Shashur Monastery in Keylong, founded in the 17th century by Lama Deva Gyatsho of Zangskar who was a missionary of the king of Bhutan Ngawang Namgyal.
  - Tayul Monastery at Satingri6km west of Keylong, founded by Lam Serzang Rinchen of Kham region of Tibet in early 17th century.
  - Kardang Monastery near Keylong on the opposite river bank, founded 900 years ago on the Bhaga River, is the largest monastry. Silver colored chorten, founded by Lama Norbu, is adjacent. Kardang also has gompa of Lama Gozzangwa, two Chhortens and rock carvings.
  - Trilokinath Temple at Tunde: Hindu temple at Udaipur dates back to early 8th century CE.
- Spiti:
  - Key Monastery:
  - Tangyud Monastery near Comic village: Built in early 14th century.
  - Kungri Monastery in Pin valley: Spiti's second oldest monastery built in 1330 CE.
  - Dhankar Gompa near Shichling: 32 kms downstream from Kaza, is the ancient capital of Spiti.
  - Kibber:
  - Tabo Monastery (called Chogs-hkhor): built in 996 CE by Rinchensang Po 46 Kms downstream from Kaza, has 9 temples and 23 chortens.

=== Sightseeing ===
In Lahaul, the Keylong, Rohtang pass, Koksar, Sissu, Gondhla, Tandi, Gushal, Jispa, Darcha, Udaipur, Suraj Taal on the summit of the Baralacha la, Chandrataal lake at 14,000 ft are some of the main tourist attractions.

In Spiti, the Kaza, Dhankar, Lhalung, Kunzum Pass, Losar, Kye, Kibber, and Pin Valley are some of the main tourist attractions.

=== Wildlife ===
Pin Valley National Park is popular for the wildlife.

== Notable people from Lahaul and Spiti ==
=== Scholars ===
- Tobdan, scholar
- Tshering Dorje, scholar

=== Soldiers ===
- Subedar Major & Hony Captain Bhim Chand, VrC & bar, 'Saviour of Ladakh'
- Subedar Major & Hony Captain Chhering Norbu Bodh, SC, mountaineer
- Colonel Thakur Prithi Chand, MVC, 'Saviour of Ladakh'
- Lieutenant Colonel Kushal Chand, MVC, 'Saviour of Ladakh
- Colonel Prem Chand. KC ,SM,VSM,MAC Gregor medal, Mentioned in dispatches.A legendary soldier and mountaineer.Did the first ascent I the world of Indias Highest Mt Kanchenjunga in 1977 . He also played a crucial role in the occupation off

Siachen glacier in 1984.

=== Sports ===
- Skalzang Dorje, Olympic archer

=== Political ===
| Year | Member | Picture | Party |
|---|---|---|---|
| 1967 | Thakur Devi Singh | | Independent |
| 1972 | Lata Thakur | | Indian National Congress |
| 1977 | Thakur Devi Singh | | Janata Party |
| 1982 | Thakur Devi Singh | | Indian National Congress |
| 1985 | Thakur Devi Singh | | Indian National Congress |
| 1990 | Phunchog Rai | | Indian National Congress |
| 1993 | Phunchog Rai | | Indian National Congress |
| 1998 | Ram Lal Markanda | | Himachal Vikas Congress |
| 2003 | Raghbir Singh Thakur | | Indian National Congress |
| 2007 | Ram Lal Markanda | | Bharatiya Janata Party |
| 2012 | Ravi Thakur | | Indian National Congress |
| 2017 | Ram Lal Markanda | | Bharatiya Janata Party |
| 2022 | Ravi Thakur | | Indian National Congress |

| No. | Constituency | Member | Party | Remarks | Reference |
|---|---|---|---|---|---|
| 21 | Lahaul and Spiti (ST) | Ram Lal Markanda | Bharatiya Janata Party | Technical Education Minister | |

Other politicians

- Lata Thakur, politician
- Parvati Devi Deskit Wangmo (born 1934), Queen mother of Ladakh and Ladakh politician
- Phunchog Rai, politician
- Ram Lal Markanda, politician
- Thakur Devi Singh, politician

== Gallery ==
=== Bhaga valley ===
From Baralacha La to the confluence at Tandi, Lahaul.

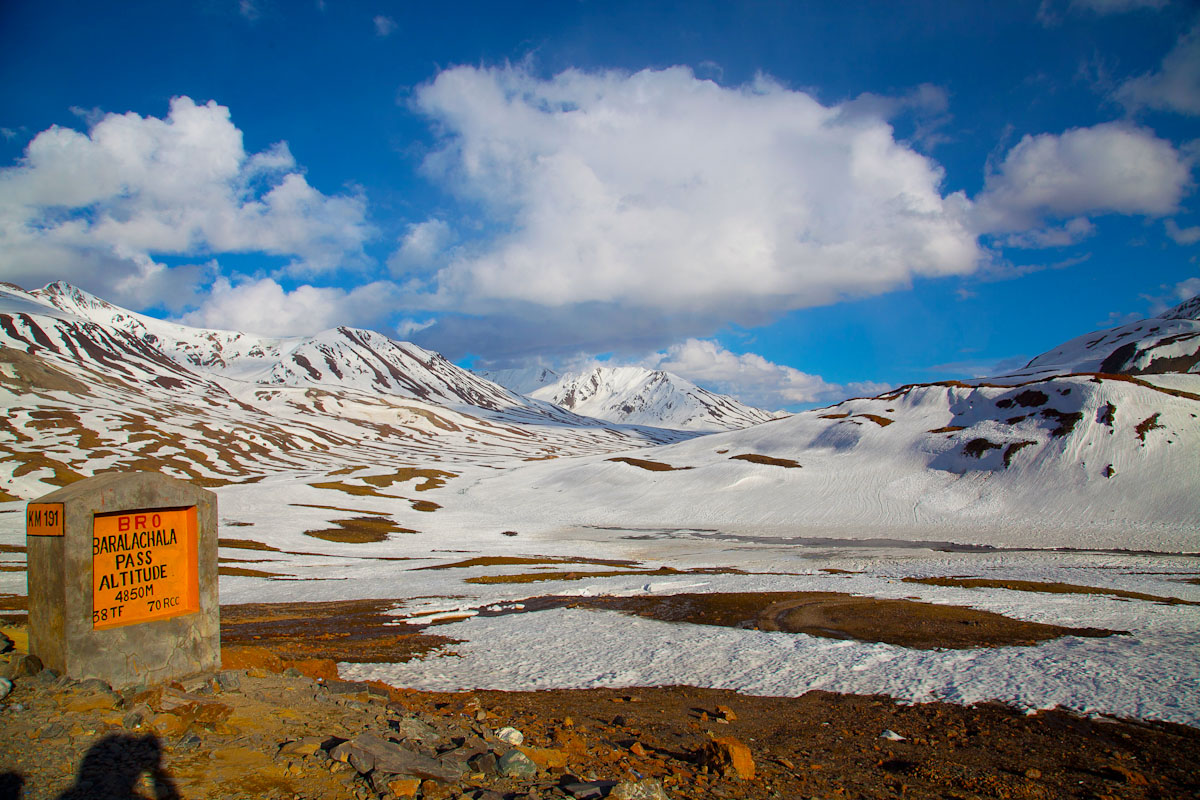
Bara-lacha la pass between Lahaul and Ladakh

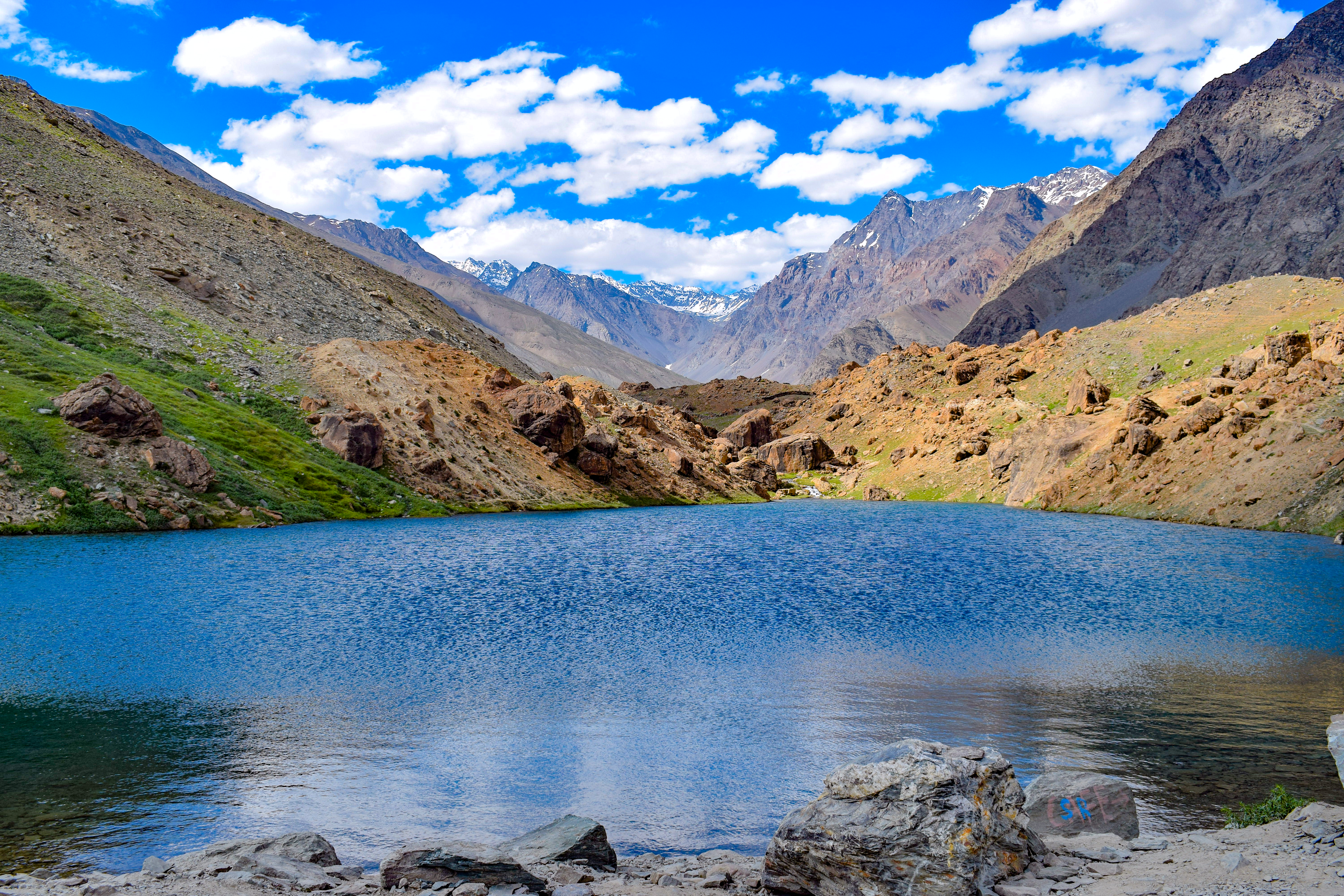
Deepak Taal, en route to Bara-lacha la

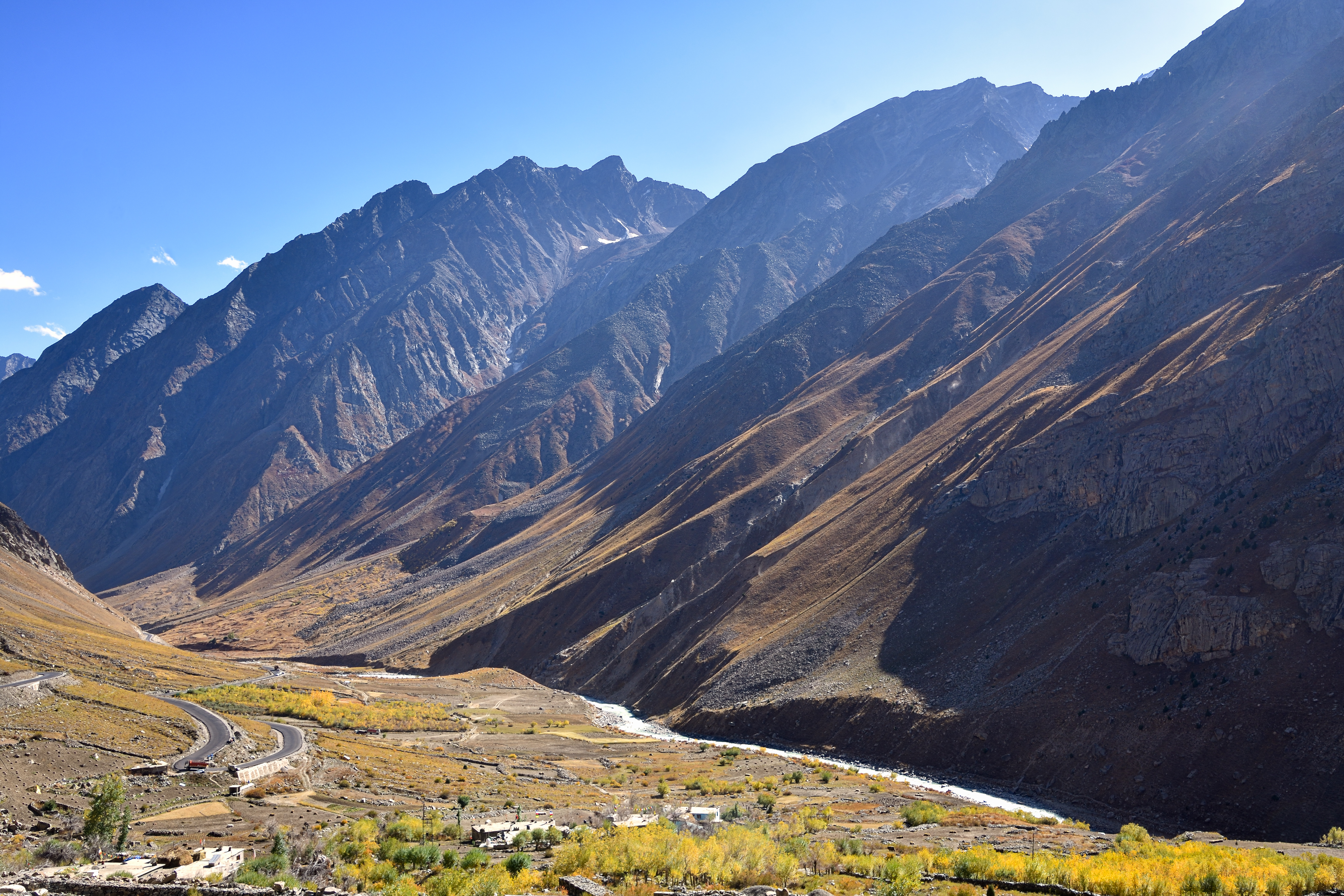
Road from Lahaul to Zanskar, Ladakh

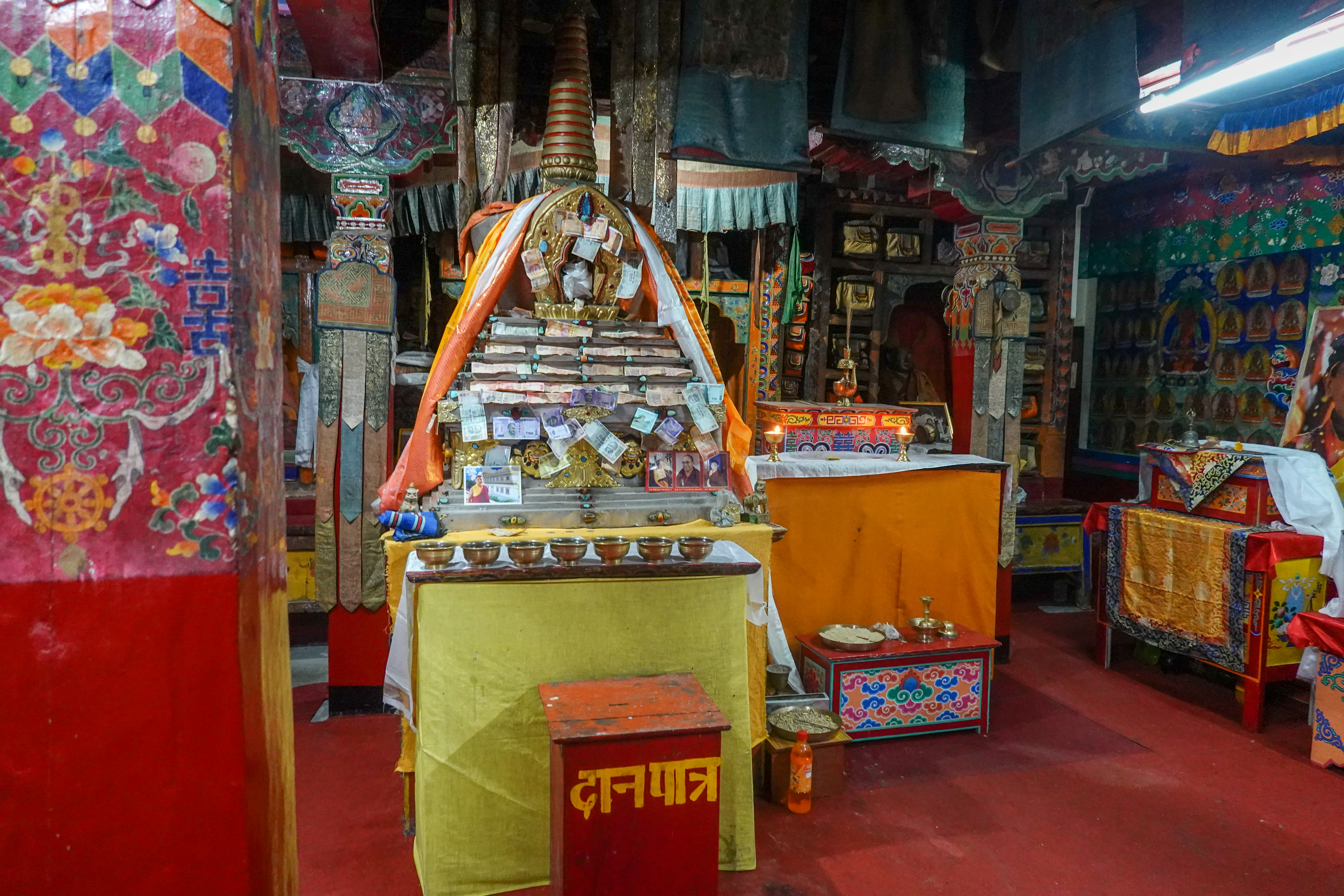
Prayer hall, Gemur Monastery, Lahaul

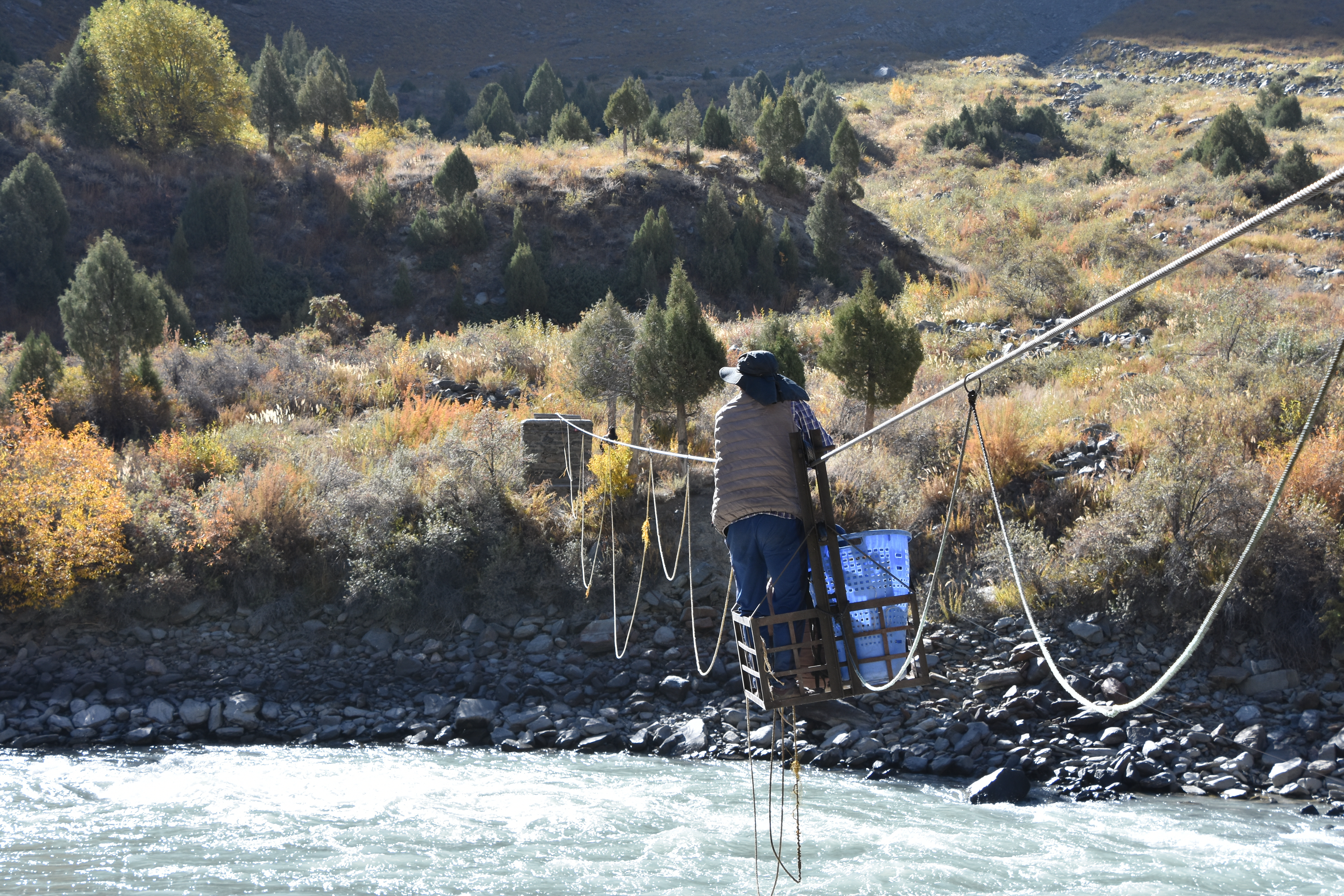
Farmer crosses Bhaga on jhulla, Gemur

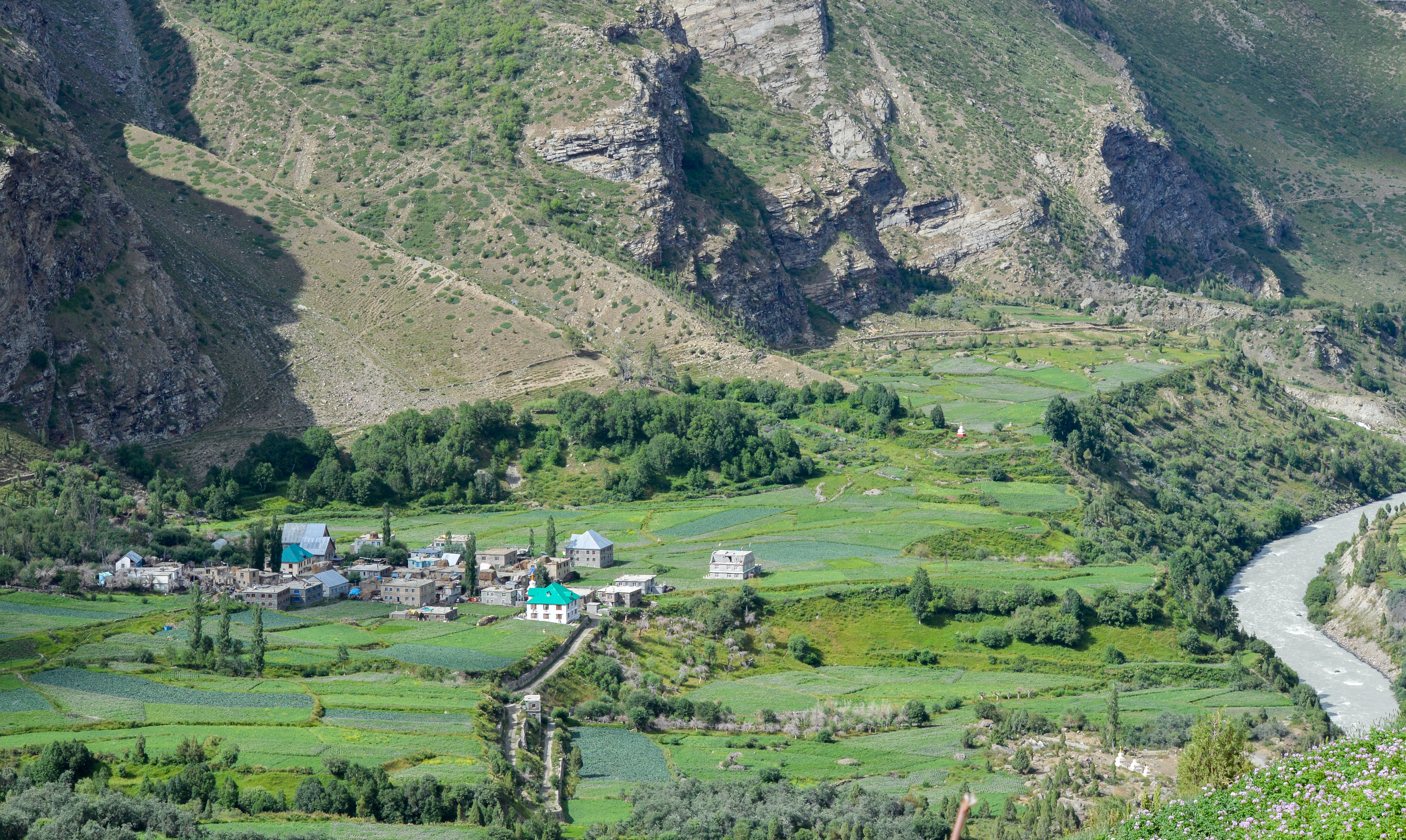
Thenu village on the Bhaga River, Lahaul

=== Chandra-Bhaga (Chenab) valley ===
From the confluence of the Chandra and Bhaga rivers at Tandi to Chamba district border downstream of Udaipur, Lahaul

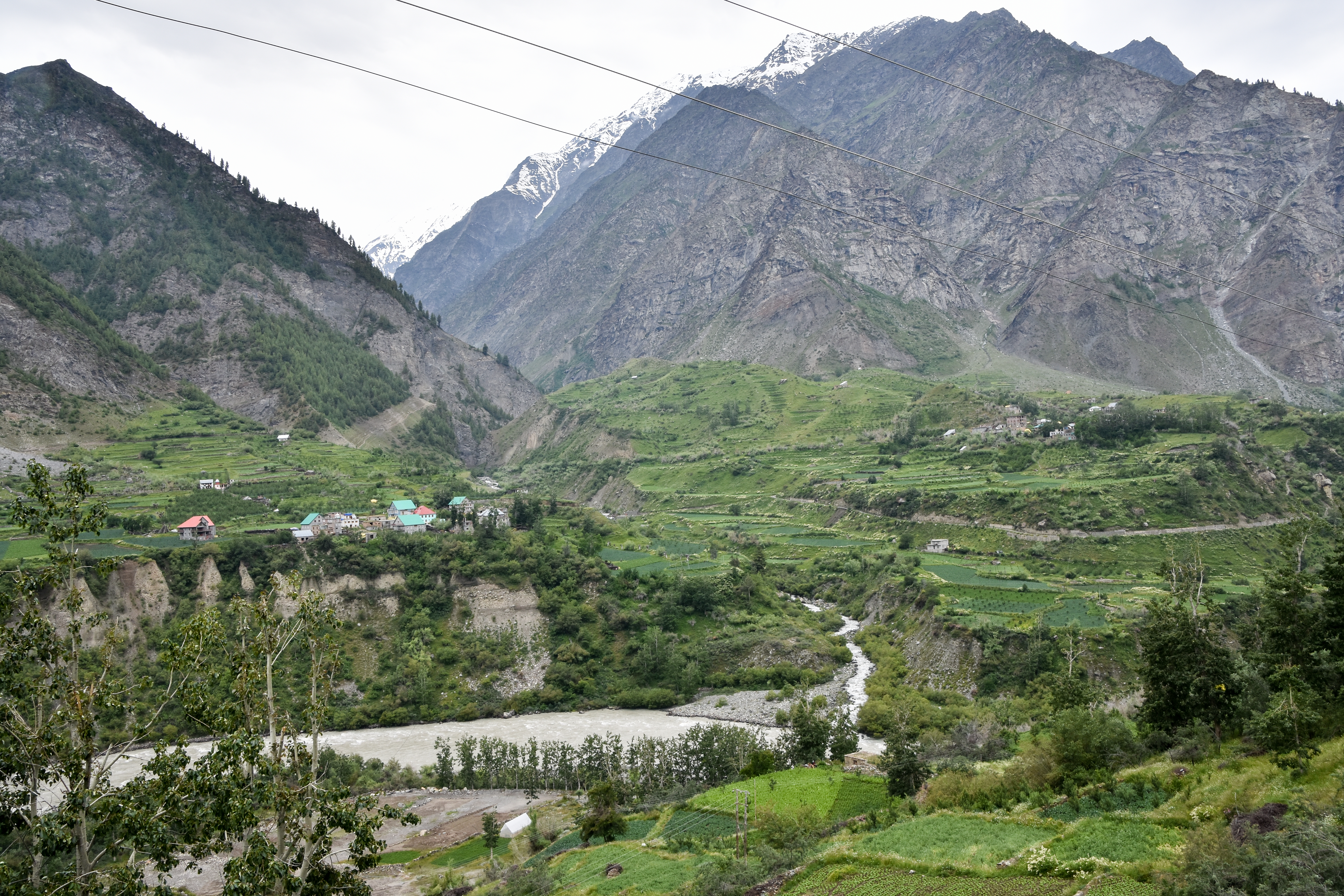
Villages on the Chandra-Bhaga near Udaipur, Lahul

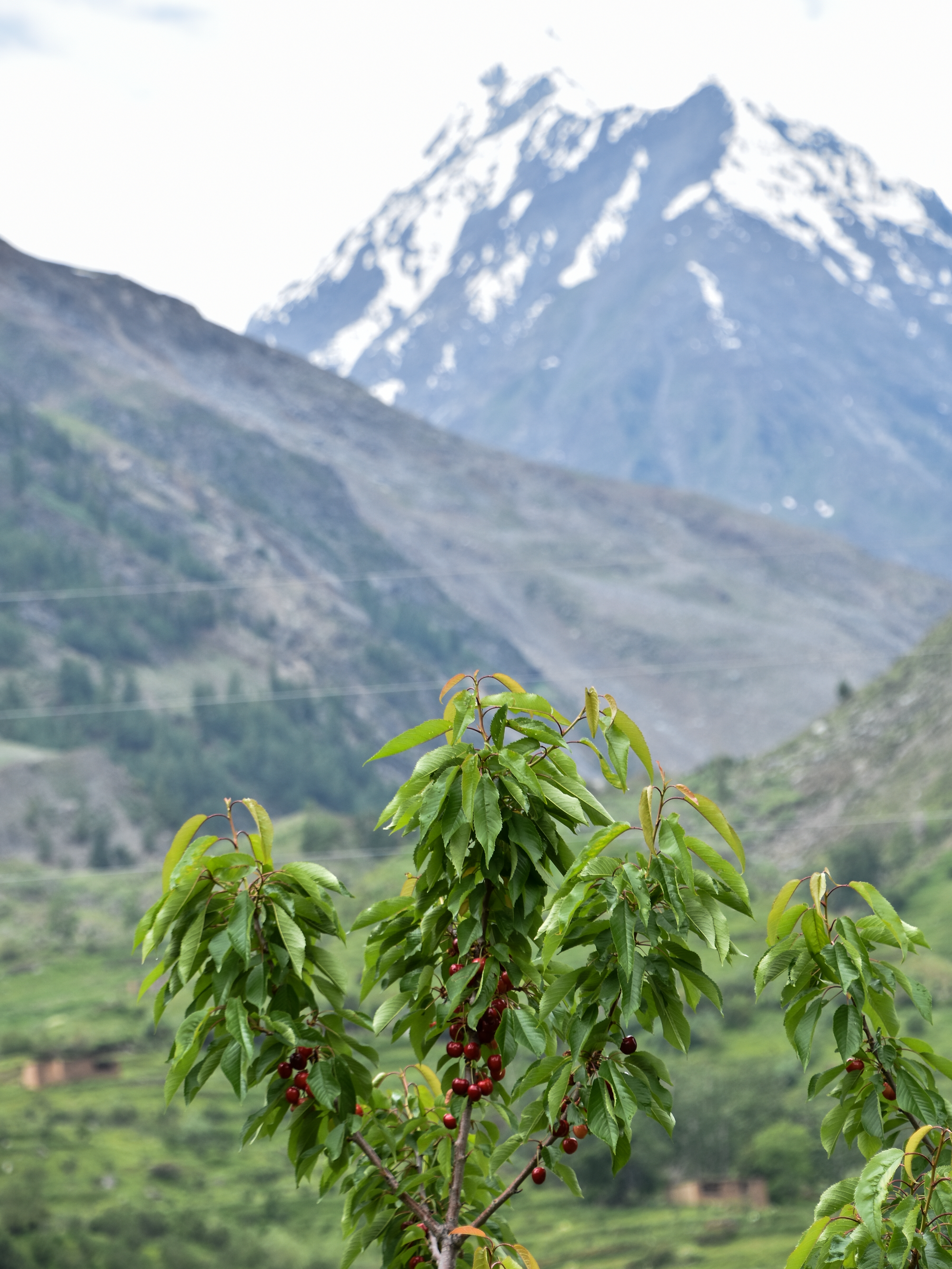
Ripe cherries for harvesting, Udaipur

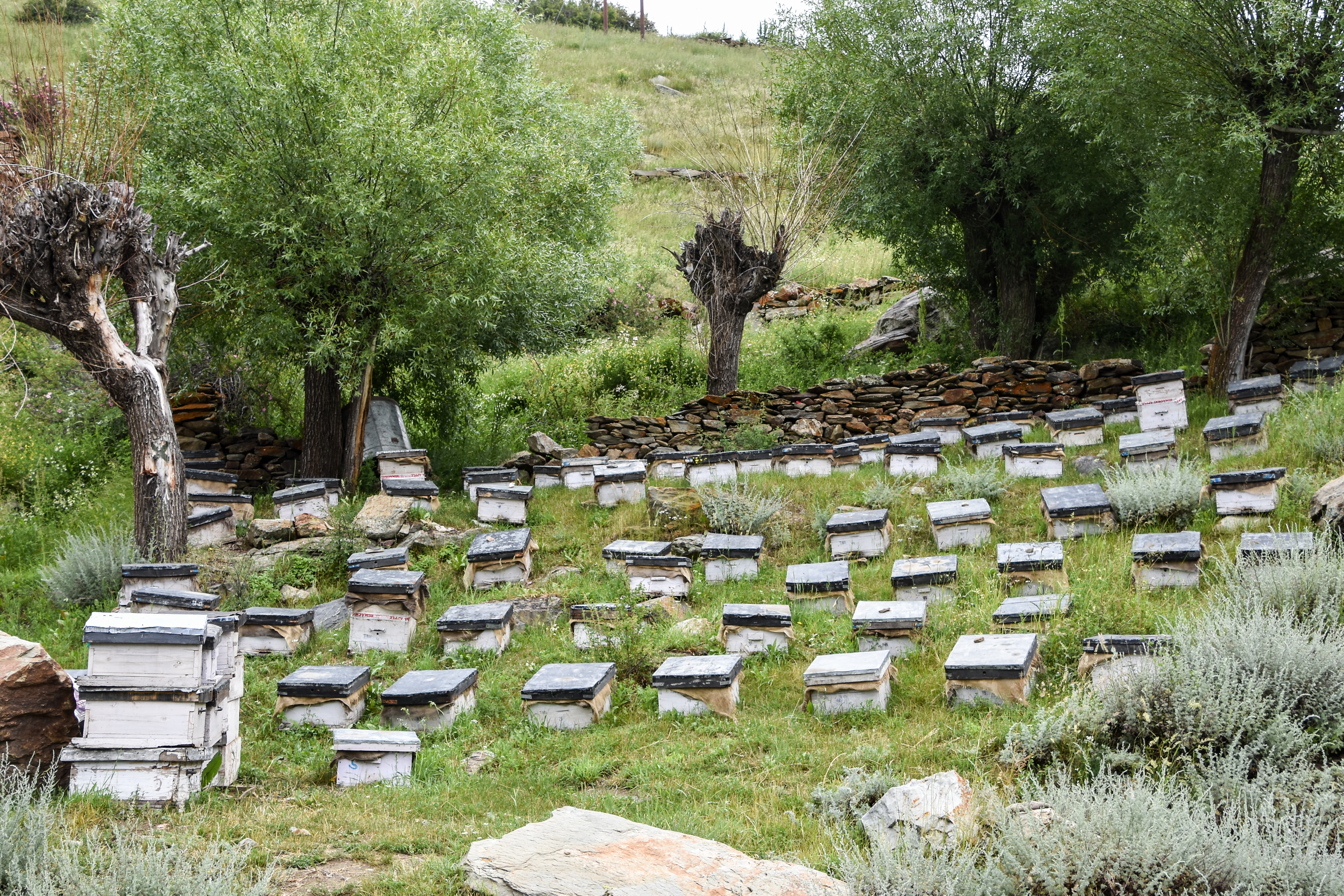
Bee hives for wildflower honey, Udaipur

=== Chandra valley ===
From the confluence at Tandi to Kunzum La separating Lahaul and Spiti

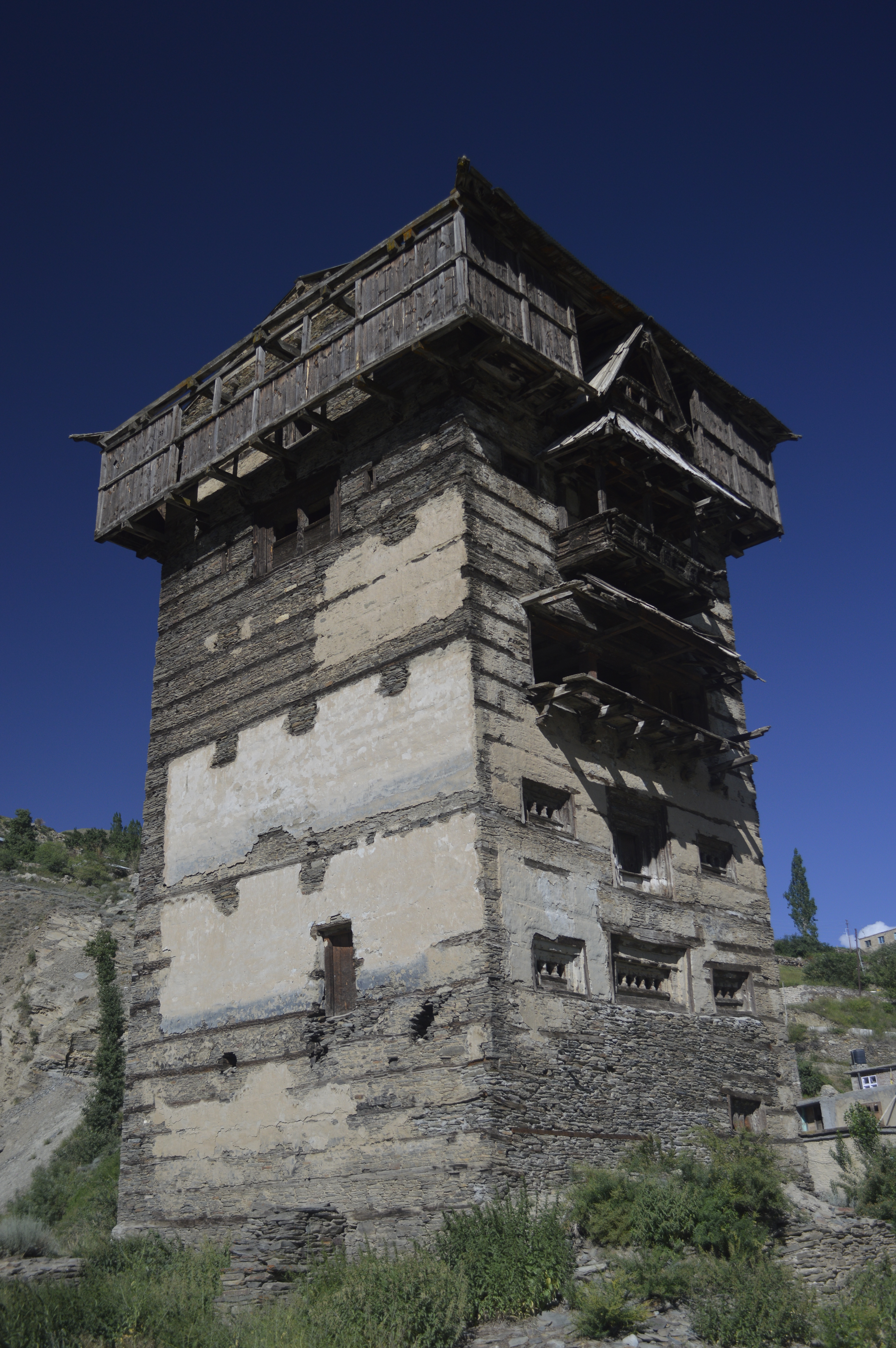
Gondla Fort

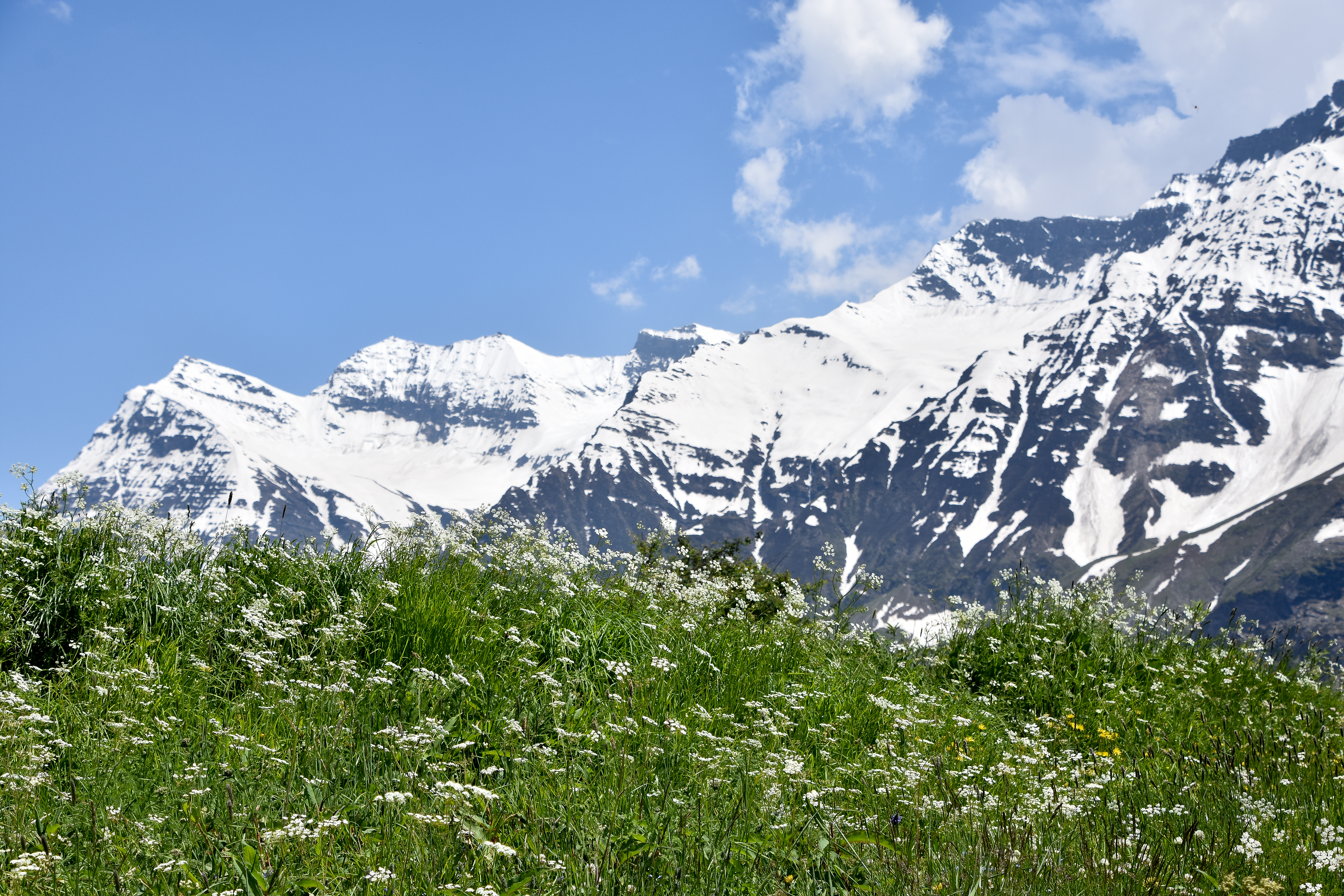
Wildflowers and mountains, Sissu, Lahaul

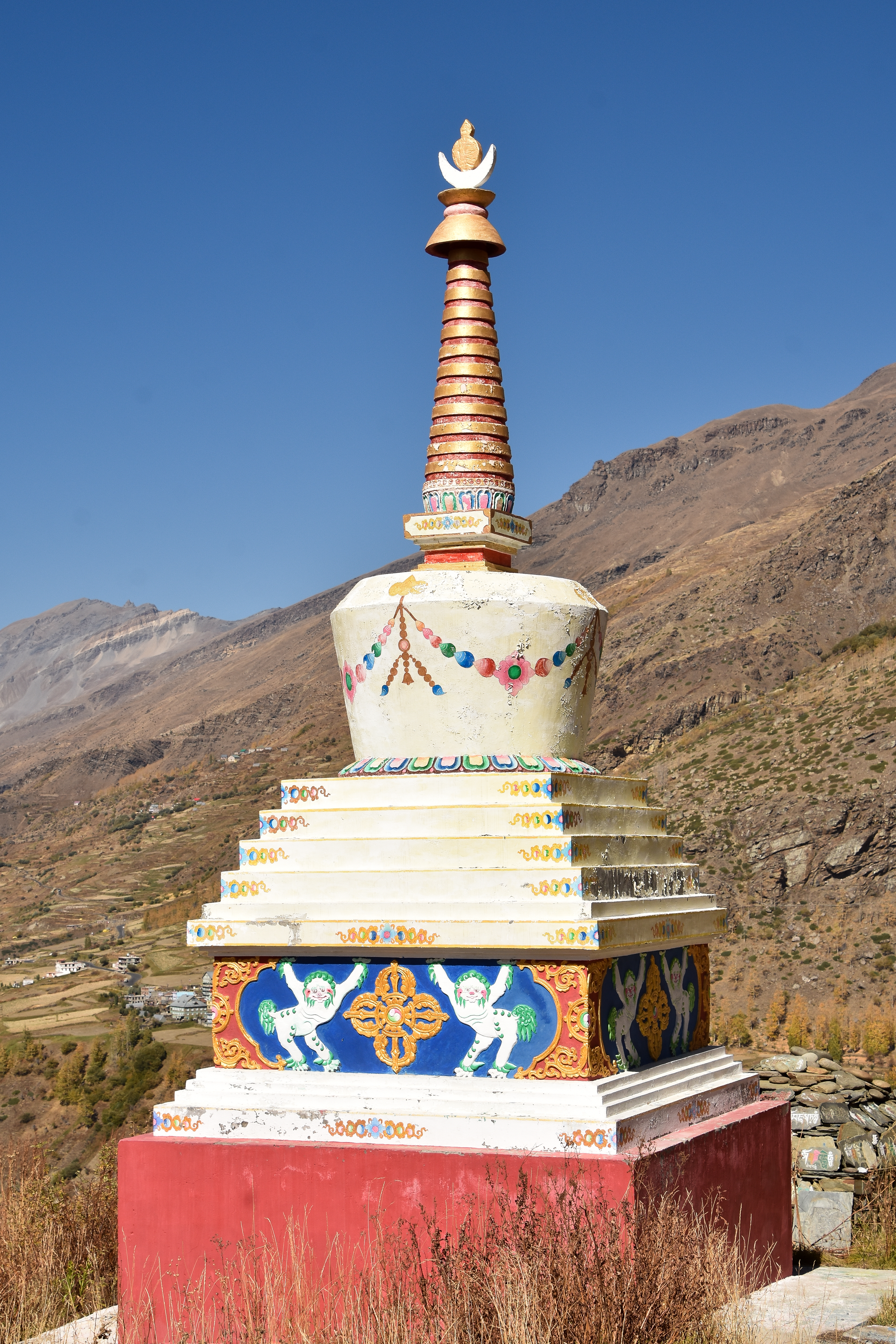
Ghepan Monastery stupa, Sissu

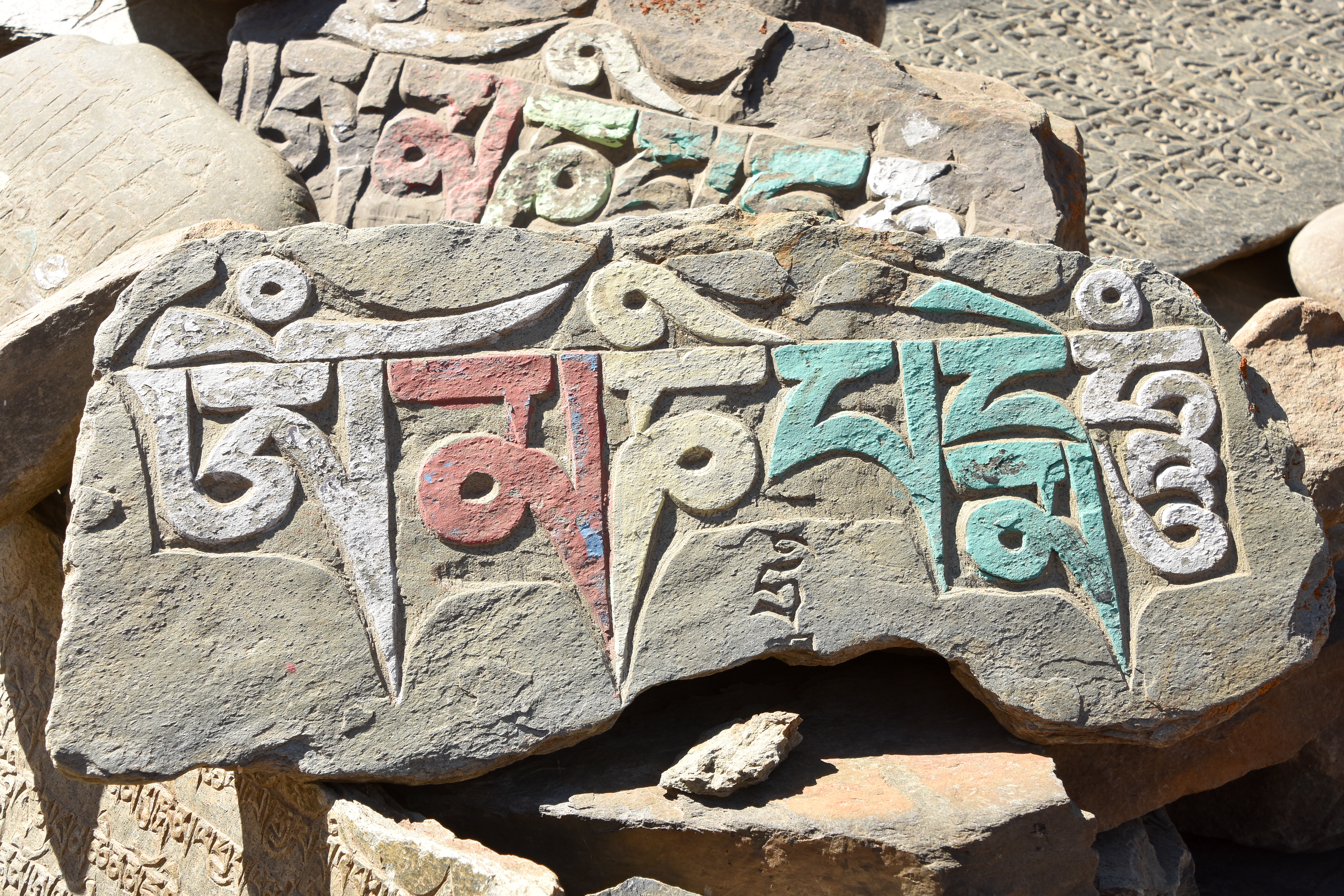
Prayer stone, Ghepan Monastery, Sissu

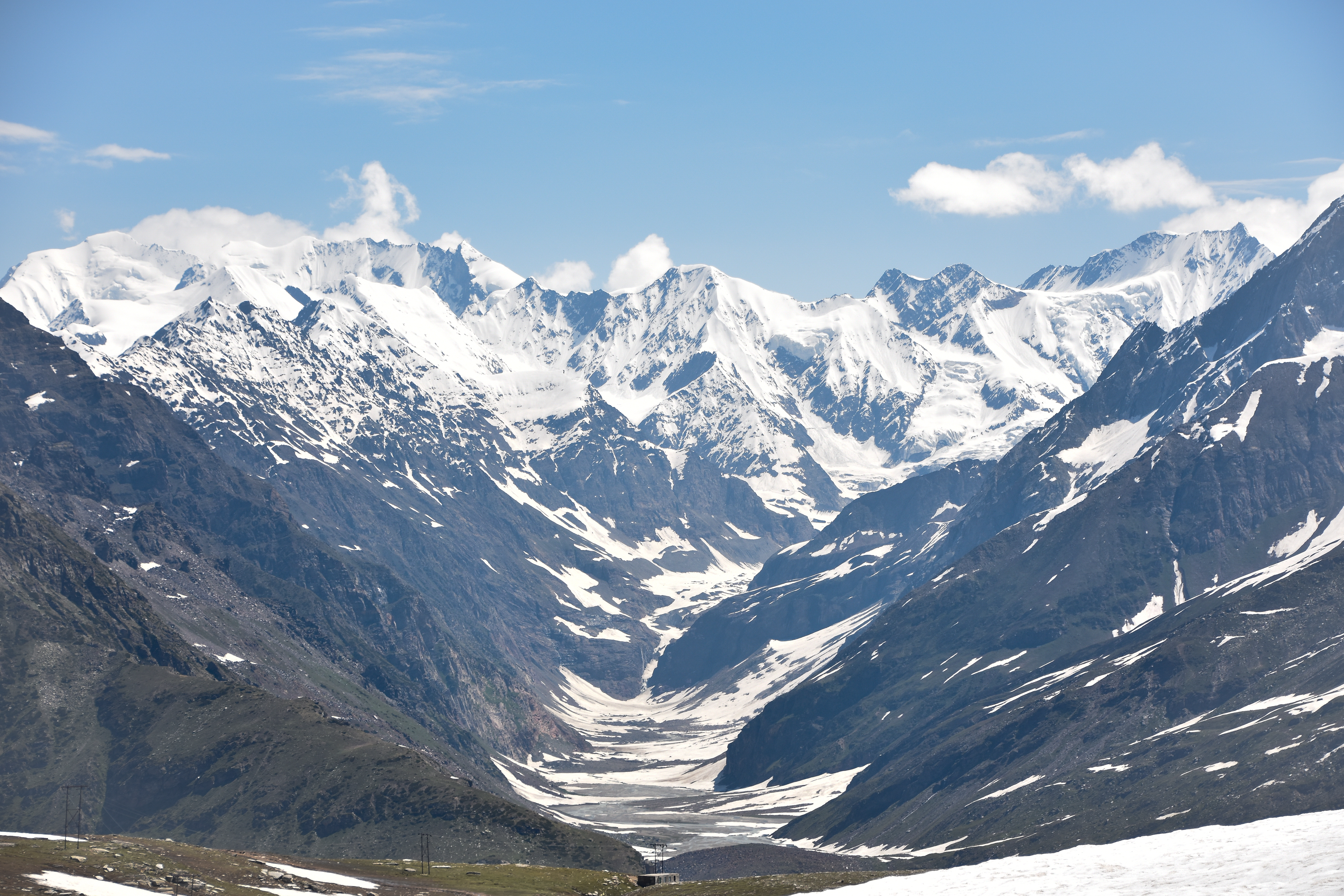
Tributary of Chandra River from Rohtang Pass

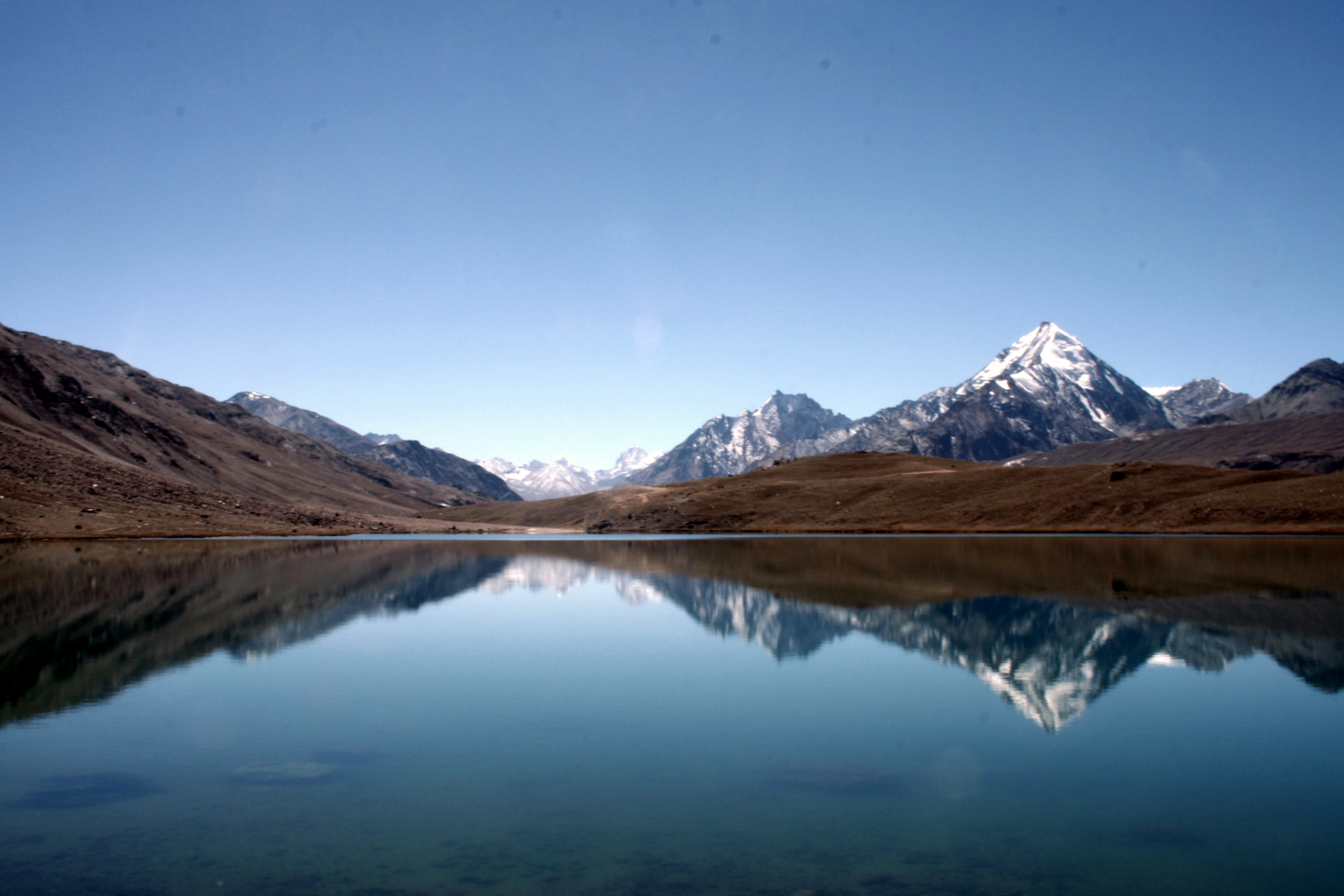
Chandra Taal near the source of the Chandra River

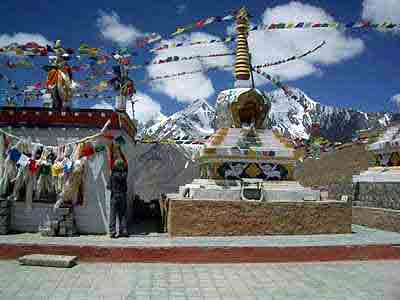
Kunzum Pass between Lahul and Spiti

=== Spiti valley ===
From Kunzum La to the border with Kinnaur district at Sumdo, Spiti.

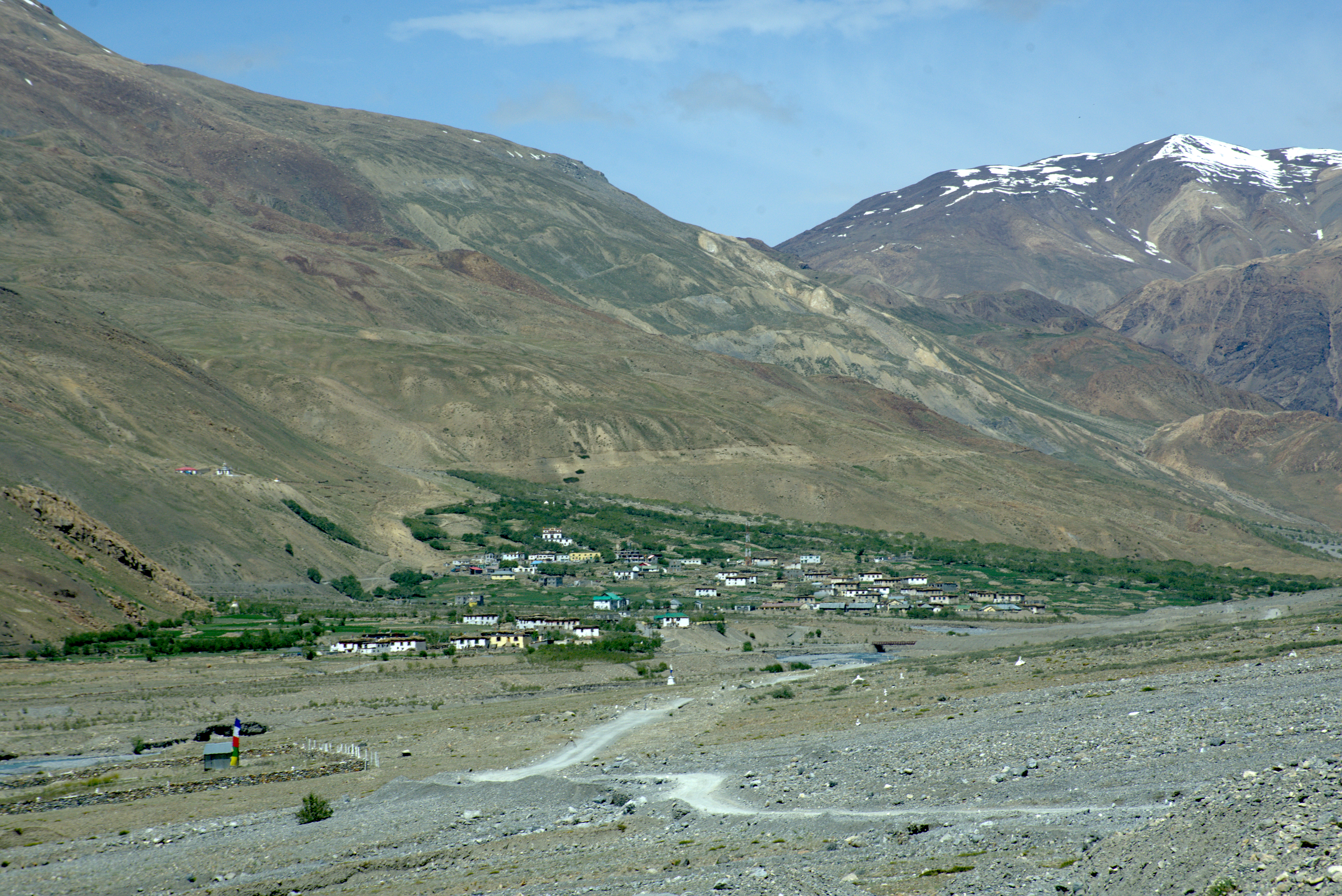
Losar Khas, first village on the Spiti river

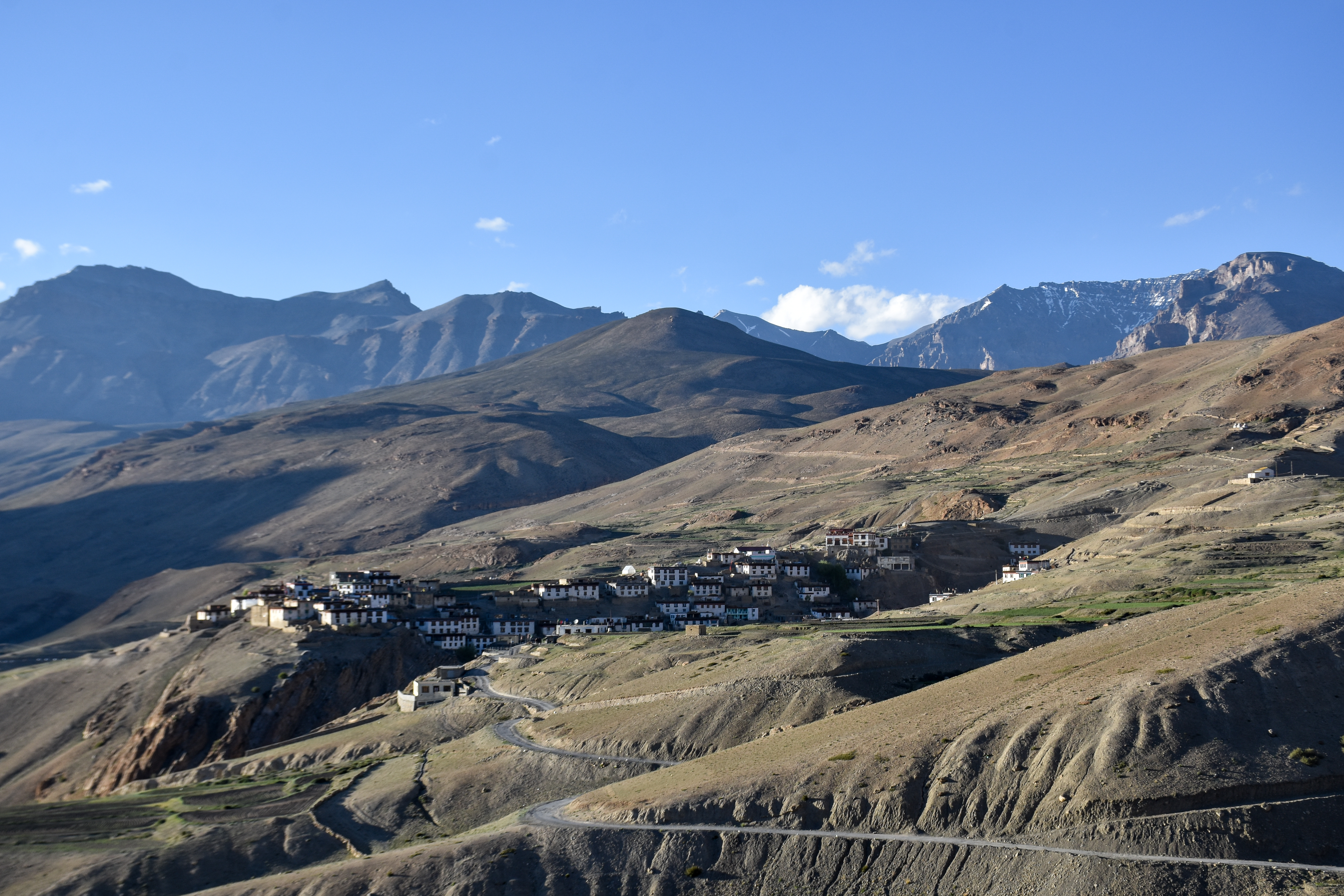
Kibber village and wildlife sanctuary, Spiti

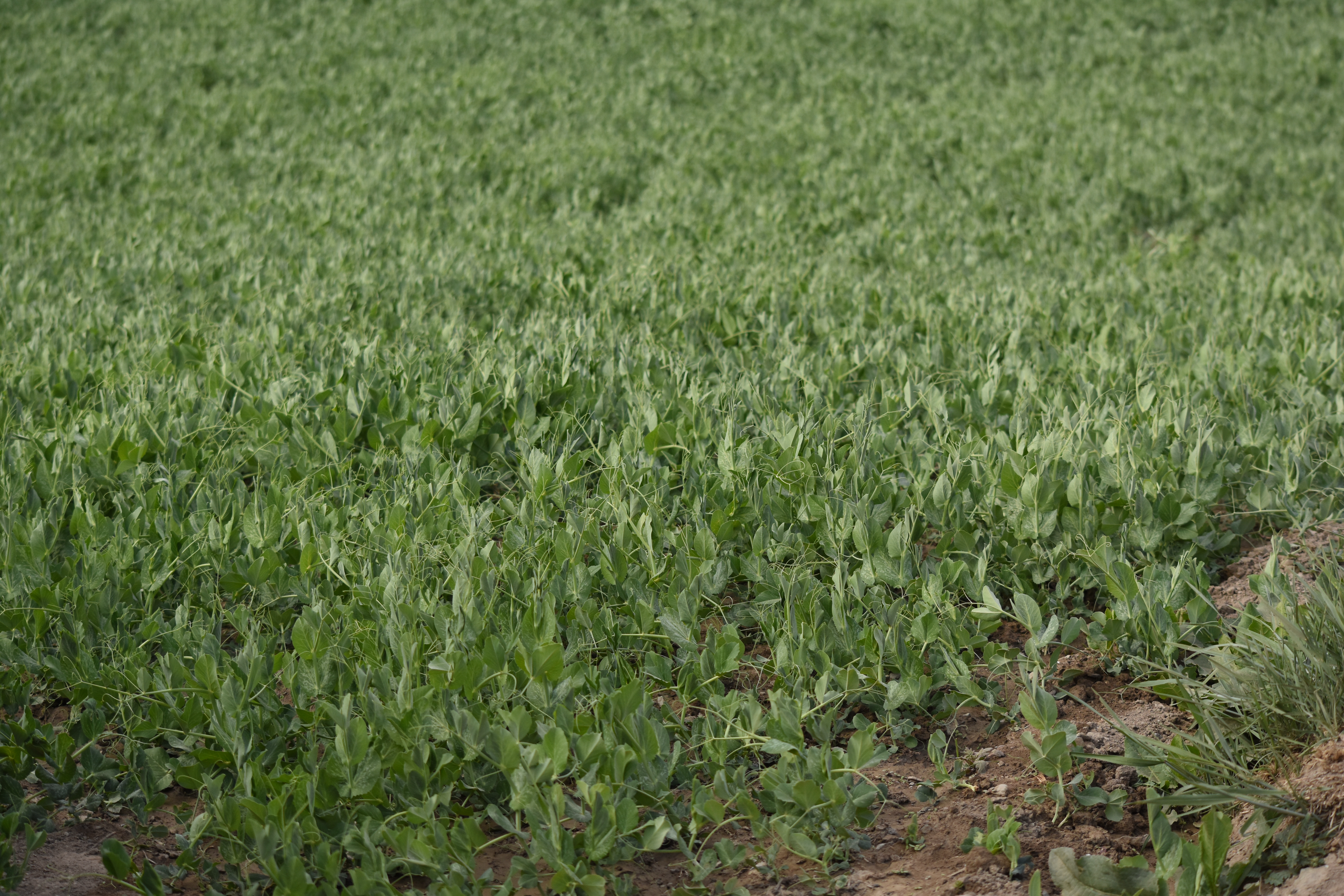
Pea plants, Mud village, Spiti

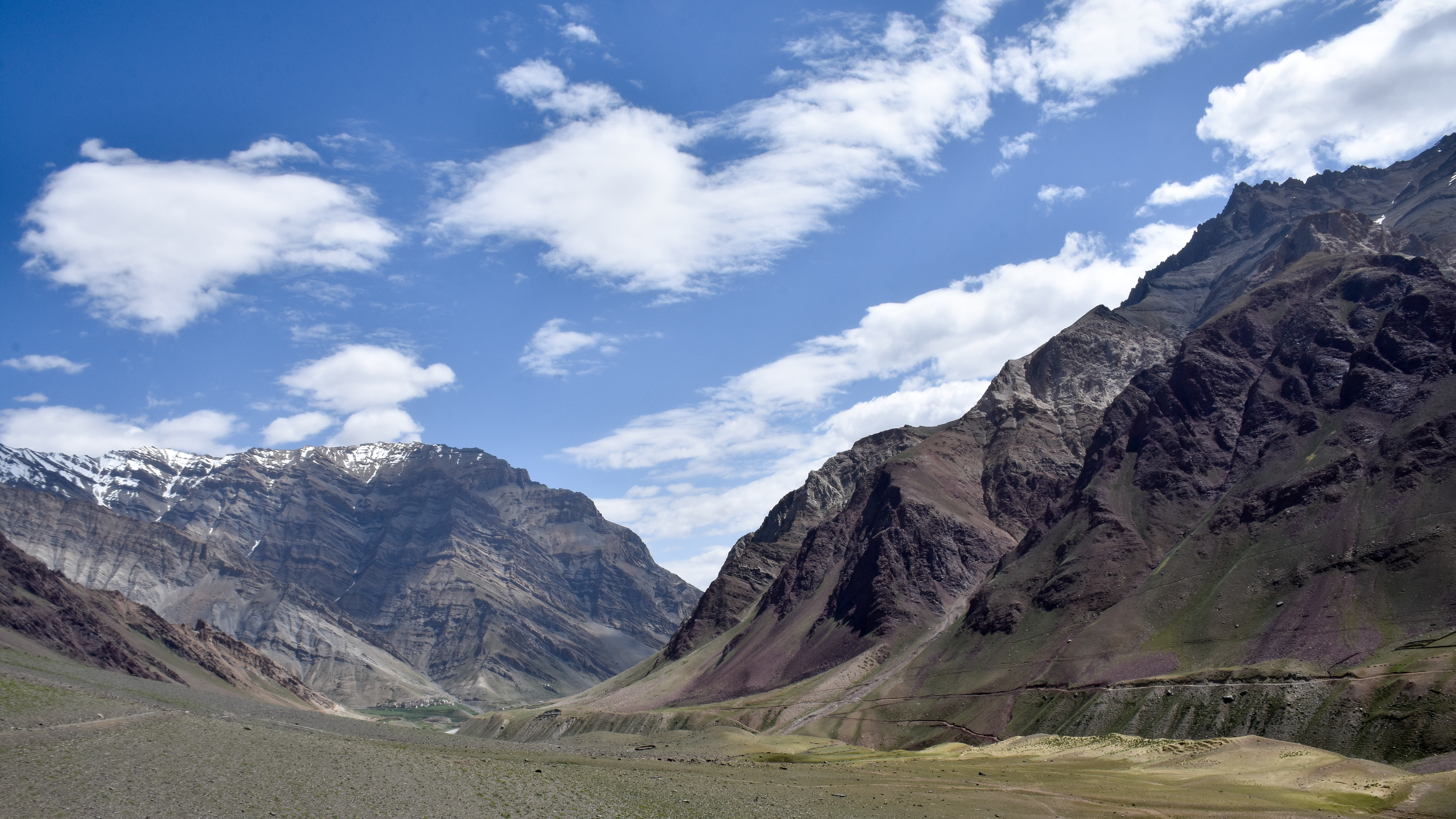
Pin river valley, Spiti

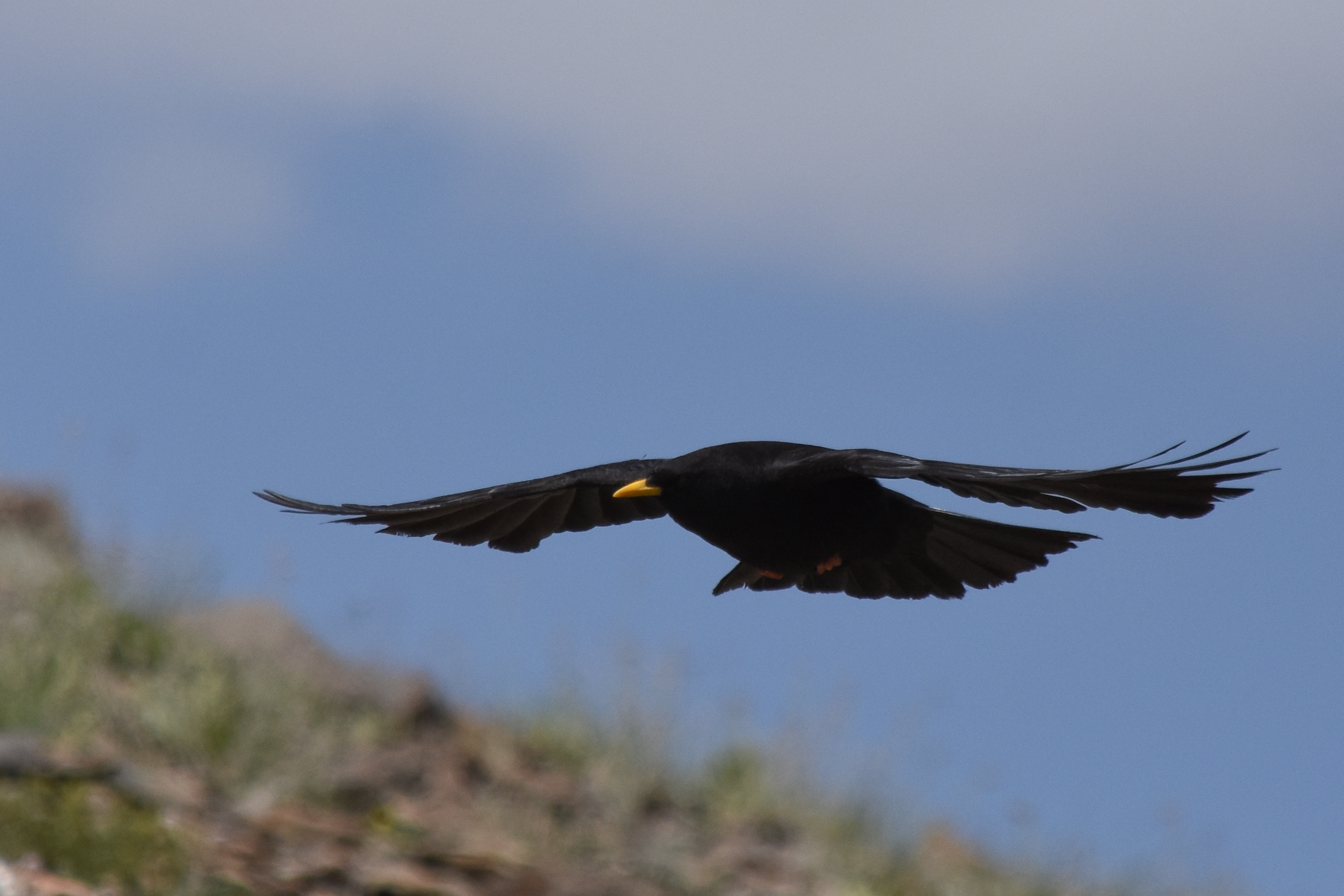
Yellow-billed chough, Pin Valley

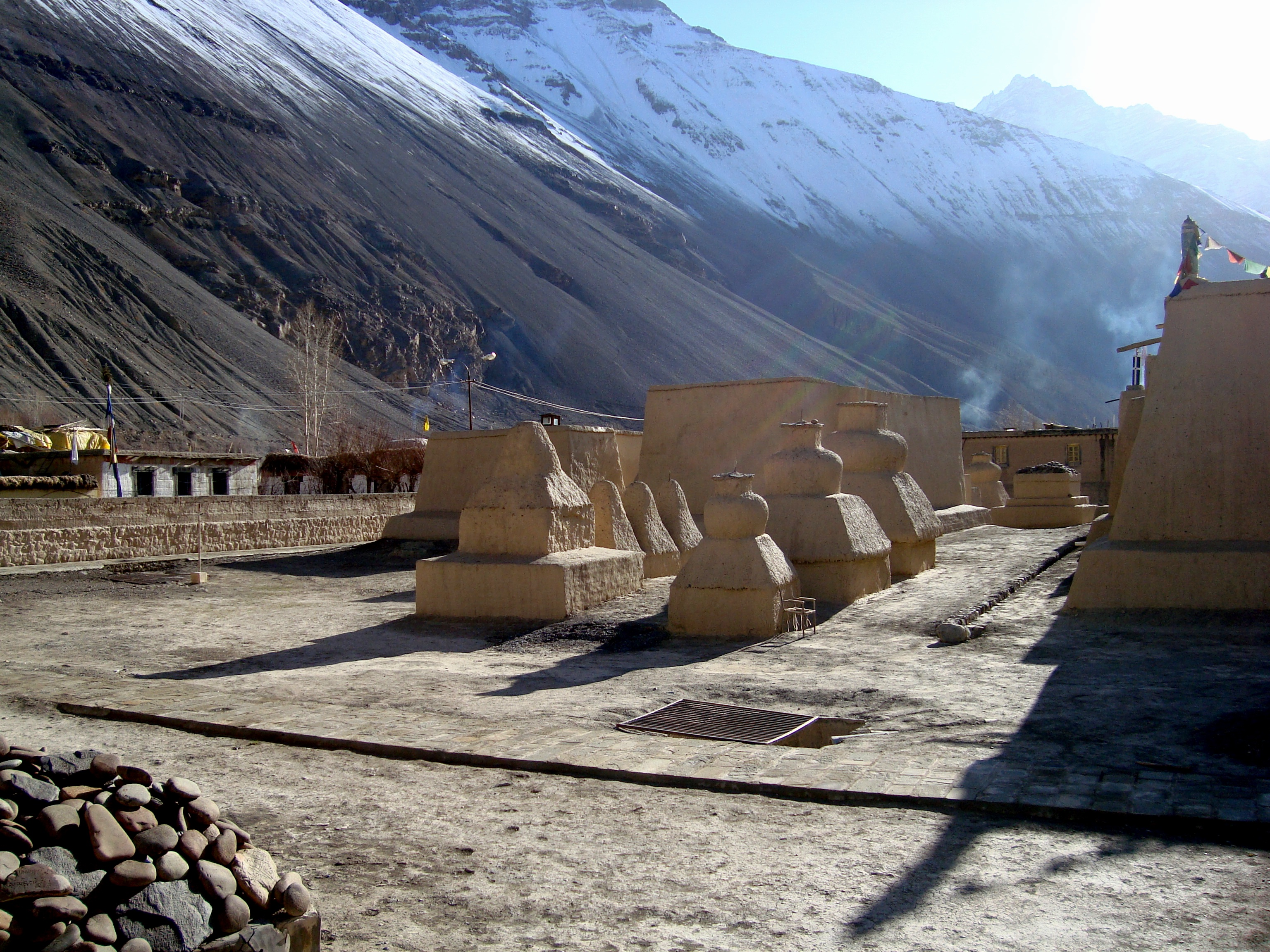
Graveyard of lamas, Tabo Monastery, Spiti

== See also ==
- List of highest towns by country
- Lahuli–Spiti languages
- Lahuli language (disambiguation)
- Spiti Bhoti
- Lahul Lohar language
- Chandratal Wildlife Sanctuary

== Bibliography ==
- Ciliberto, Jonathan. (2013). "Six Weeks in the Spiti Valley". Circle B Press. 2013. Atlanta. ISBN 978-0-9659336-6-7
- Handa, O. C. (1987). Buddhist Monasteries in Himachal Pradesh. Indus Publishing Company, New Delhi. ISBN 81-85182-03-5.
- Hutchinson, J. & J. PH Vogel (1933). History of the Panjab Hill States, Vol. II. (1st ed) Lahore: Govt. Printing, Punjab, 1933. Reprint 2000. Department of Language and Culture, Himachal Pradesh. Chapter X Lahaul, pp. 474–483; Spiti, pp. 484–488.
- Kapadia, Harish. (1999). Spiti: Adventures in the Trans-Himalaya. 2nd ed. New Delhi: Indus Publishing Company. ISBN 81-7387-093-4.
- Janet Rizvi. (1996). Ladakh: Crossroads of High Asia. Second Edition. Oxford University Press, Delhi. ISBN 0-19-564546-4.
- Cunningham, Alexander. (1854). LADĀK: Physical, Statistical, and Historical with Notices of the Surrounding Countries. London. Reprint: Sagar Publications (1977).
- Francke, A. H. (1977). A History of Ladakh. (Originally published as, A History of Western Tibet, (1907). 1977 Edition with critical introduction and annotations by S. S. Gergan & F. M. Hassnain. Sterling Publishers, New Delhi.
- Francke, A. H. (1914). Antiquities of Indian Tibet. Two Volumes. Calcutta. 1972 reprint: S. Chand, New Delhi.
- Banach, Benti (2010). 'A Village Called Self-Awareness, life and times in Spiti Valley'. Vajra Publications, Kathmandu ISBN 9937506441.
