= Spiti Bhoti =

Tibetic language of India

- Spiti
- Native to: India
- Region: Himachal Pradesh
- Native speakers: (10,000 cited 2000)
- Language family: Sino-Tibetan: Tibeto-Burman; Tibeto-Kanauri (?); Bodish; Tibetic; Lahuli–Spiti; Spiti Bhoti

Language codes
- ISO 639-3: spt
- Glottolog: spit1240
- ELP: Spiti Bhoti

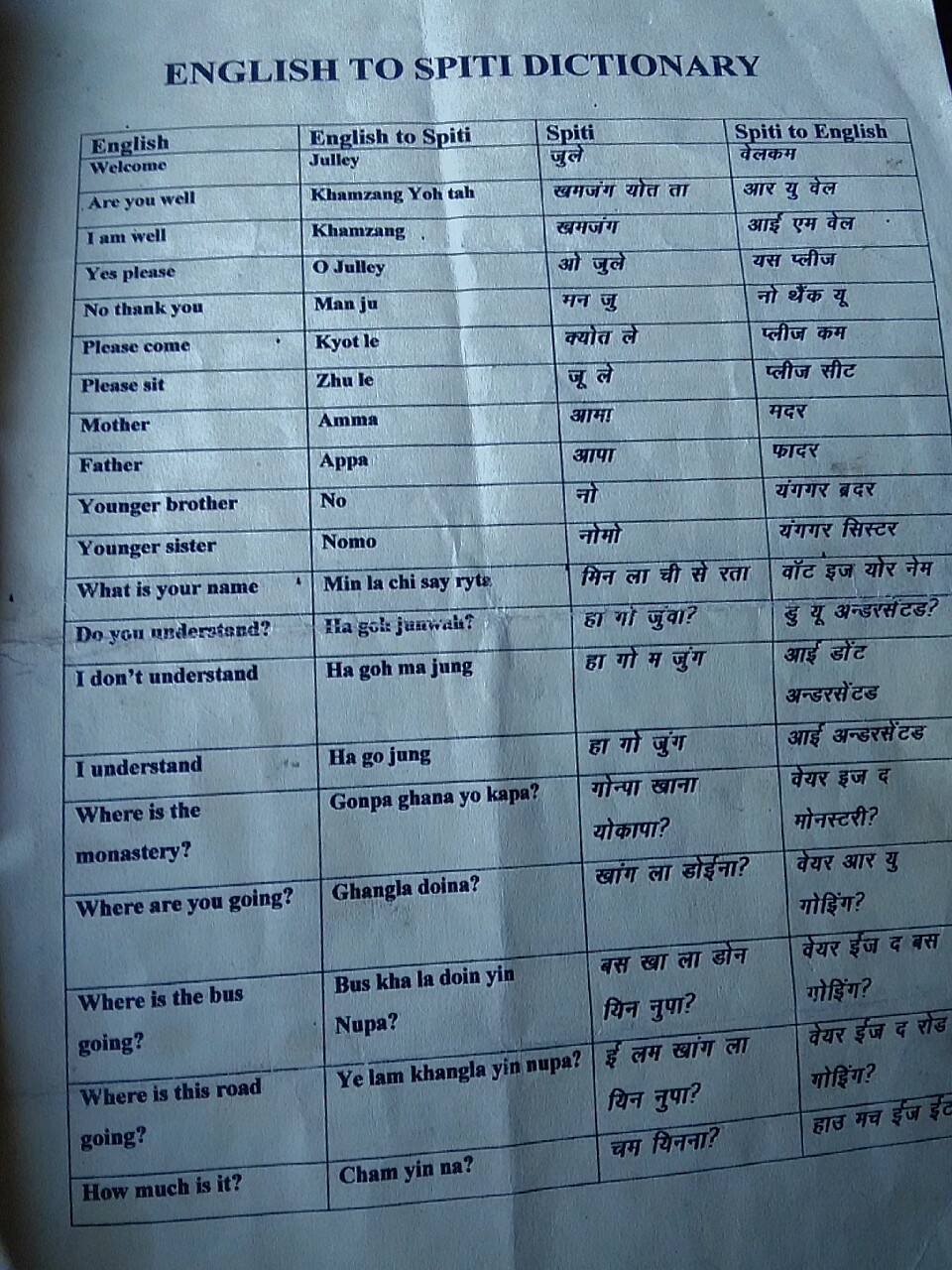
Words in English and Spiti

Spiti Bhoti is a Tibetic language spoken in Spiti valley, India. It is classified as one of the Lahauli-Spiti languages. It forms a closely knit group with other Lahuli–Spiti languages, and is fairly close to Standard Tibetan.

There is a 74% lexical similarity with the related language Stod Bhoti or Lahuli.
