= Trilokinath Temple at Tunde =

Human settlement in India

Coordinates: 32°42′N 76°41′E

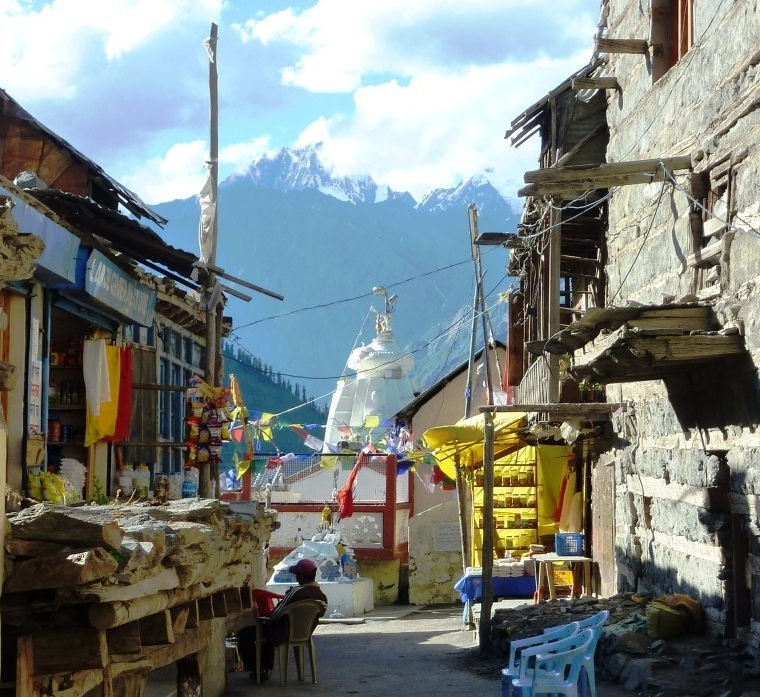
Trilokinath street and temple.

The Sri Trilokinath ji Temple (tibetan Garsha Phagpa གར་ཞ་འཕགས་པ) is in a village of same name 6 km south of the left bank of the Chaṅdrābhāgā or Chenab River, and about 9 km from the village of Udaipur, in the Lahul and Spiti District of Himachal Pradesh, India. It is sacred to both Tibetan Buddhists and Hindus. The glittering white-painted temple is situated on a cliff at the end of a village street. Its altitude is 2,760 metres (9,055 ft).

== Name ==
'Trilokinath' is one of the names of the Hindu god, Shiva, meaning the "Leader of the Trinity". but local tradition clearly states that it was originally a Buddhist vihara or monastery, although nothing remains of the original building.

== History ==
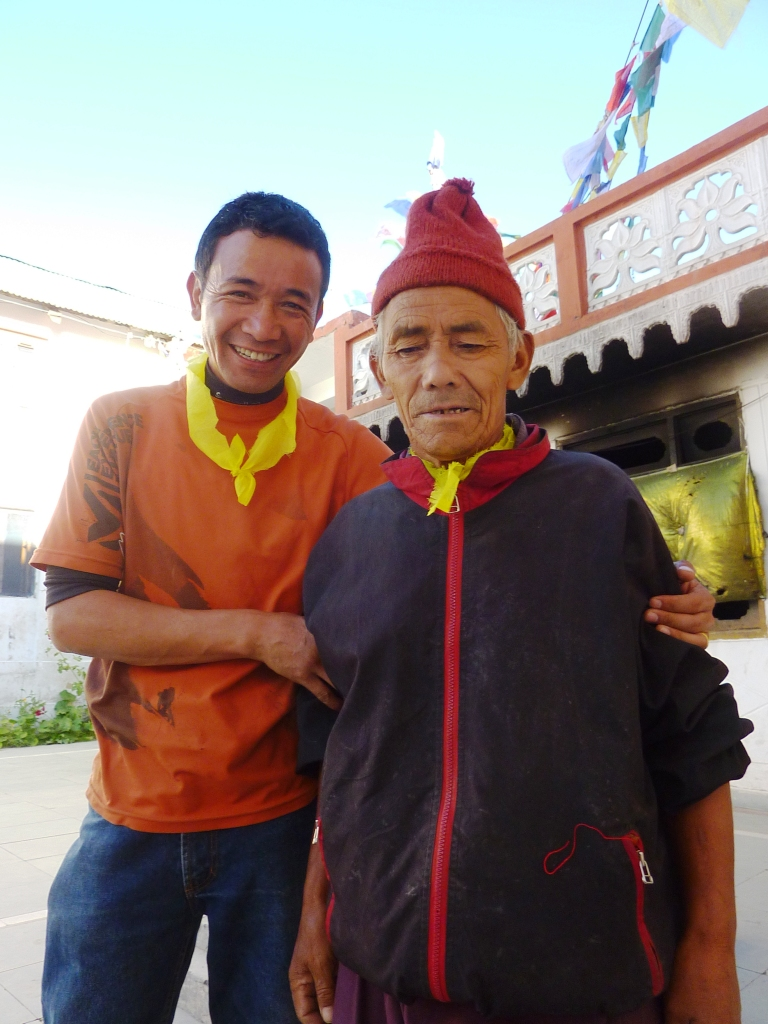
Pilgrims at Trilokinath.

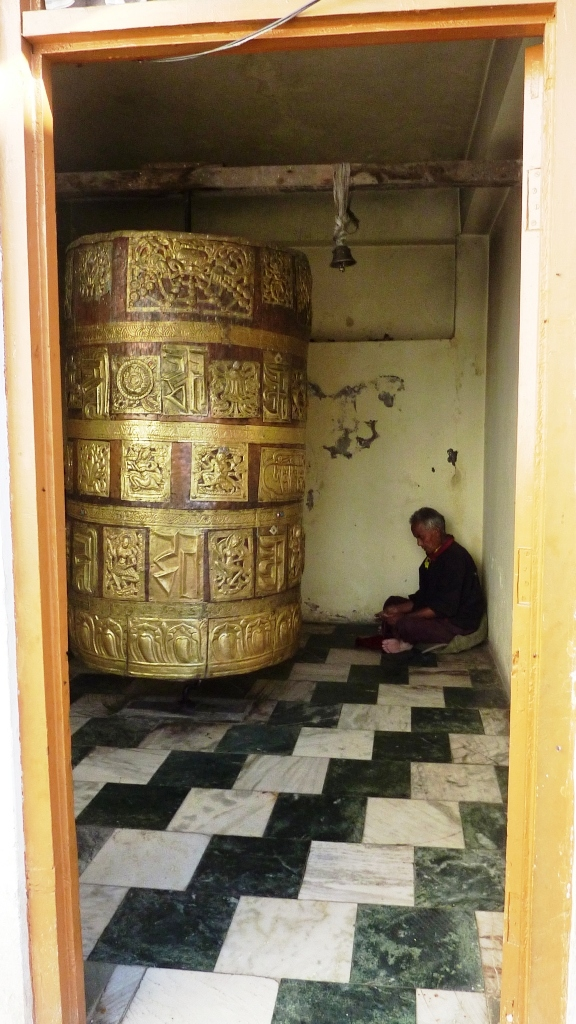
Buddhist prayer wheel at Tilokinath.

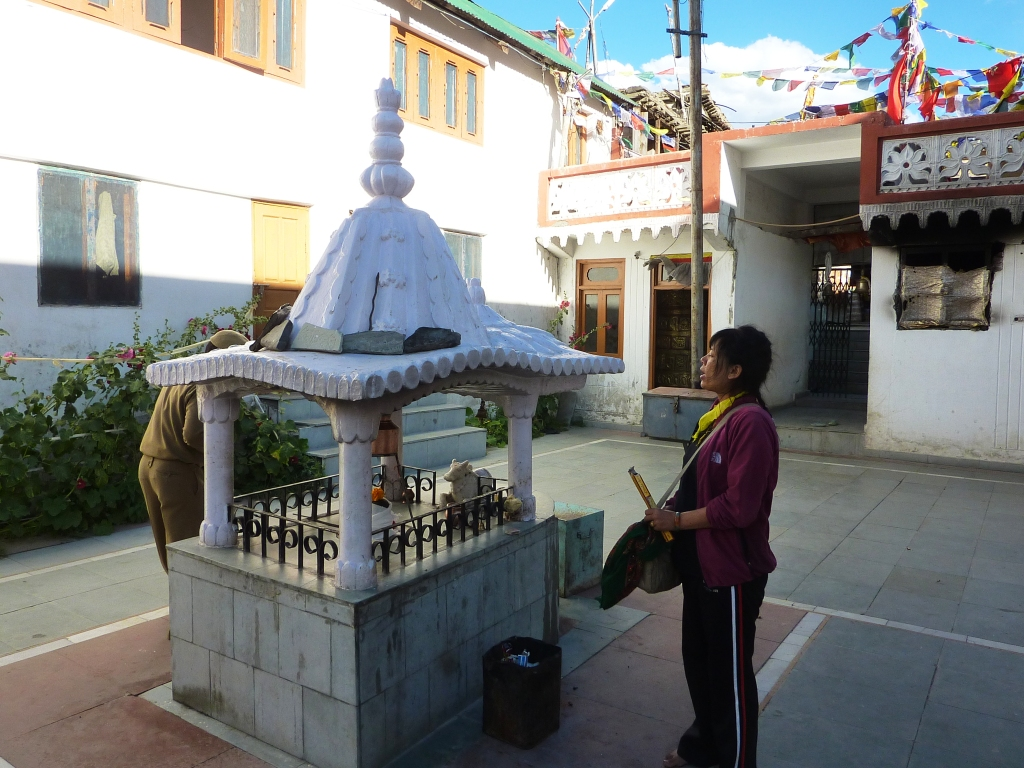
Shrine for Shiva's lingam and bull Nandi in courtyard.

There is apparently nothing left of the original temple structure, but there is a strong local tradition that says Trilokinath was originally a Buddhist vihara. The temple had a marble statue of a six-headed Avalokiteshvara which was stolen decades ago and replaced initially with a crude image made of grey stone, and later with the present six-armed white marble Avalokiteshvara, which is attributed by some to the 12th century. It is revered as Avalokiteshvara by Buddhists and as Shiva by Hindus and is crowned with an image of Amitabha Buddha - the 'Buddha of Boundless Light.'

The original image is said to have been coeval with the Avalokiteshvara head found near the confluence of the Chandra and Bhaga rivers and is now housed at the Guru Ghantal or Gandhola Monastery. This head has been claimed to date to the time of Nagarjuna (2nd century CE) which may indicate some connection with the famous Kanika (Kanishka) stupa at Sani Monastery in nearby Zangskar. Handa, though, both these images can be dated on stylistic grounds to around the 8th century or a century earlier.

Hutchinson and Vogel speculate that it was originally a Shiva temple but was made into a Buddhist place of worship by Padmasambhava in the 8th century. They also state that the "Guru Ghantal white marble head is of the same workmanship as the Trilokinath image, and both are of the same Boddhisatva."

A popular story says that a Kulu Raja reached Trilokinath and tried to carry off the idol, but was defeated in the attempt, as the stone became too heavy to move. There is a mark on the right leg of the marble figure, which is said to have resulted from a sword blow by a Kullu soldier of the time.

The original temple columns date from the time of King Lalitaditya in the 9th century CE. At the courtyard are large Buddhist prayer wheels and a granite lingam and small Nandi (bull) representing Shiva, while the ancient wooden pagoda-style temple is decorated with Tibetan prayer flags. Both Hindus and Buddhists celebrate the three-day Pauri Festival here in August.

Typical of the style introduced in the region during the 7th to 8th centuries, this temple consists of a curvilinear stone tower shikhara crowned with the characteristic amalka (imitating a segmented gourd). Unlike the temples on the plains there is no pillared hall mandapa in the hill temples perhaps due to the lack of clear ground.

A silver idol of Kali as Mahishasurmardini was installed by Thakur Himpala in 1959-60.

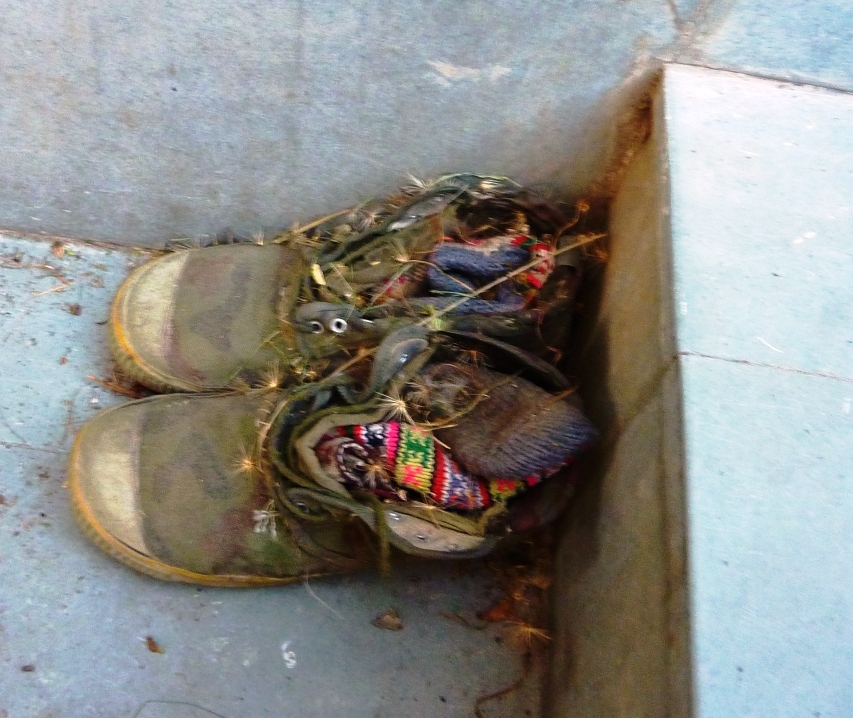
Pilgrim's shoes showing local knitted socks and straw stuffing outside temple.
