= Kungri Monastery =

Buddhist monastery in Himachal Pradesh, northern India

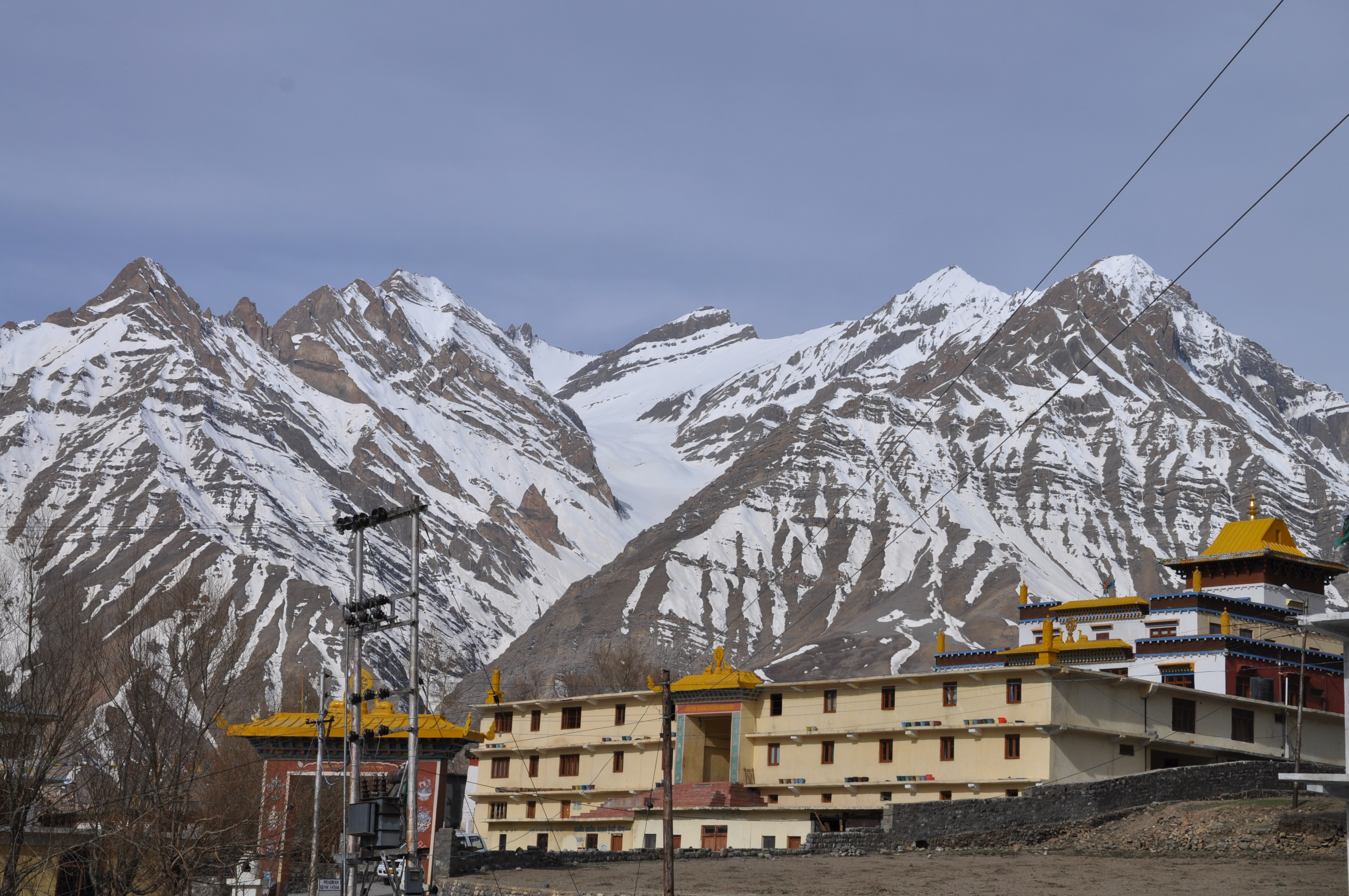

Religion
- Affiliation: Tibetan Buddhism
- Sect: Nyingma

Location
- Location: Lahul and Spiti, Himachal Pradesh, India
- Country: India
- Interactive map of Kungri Monastery
- Coordinates: 32.044°N 78.075°E

Architecture
- Established: 1330; 696 years ago

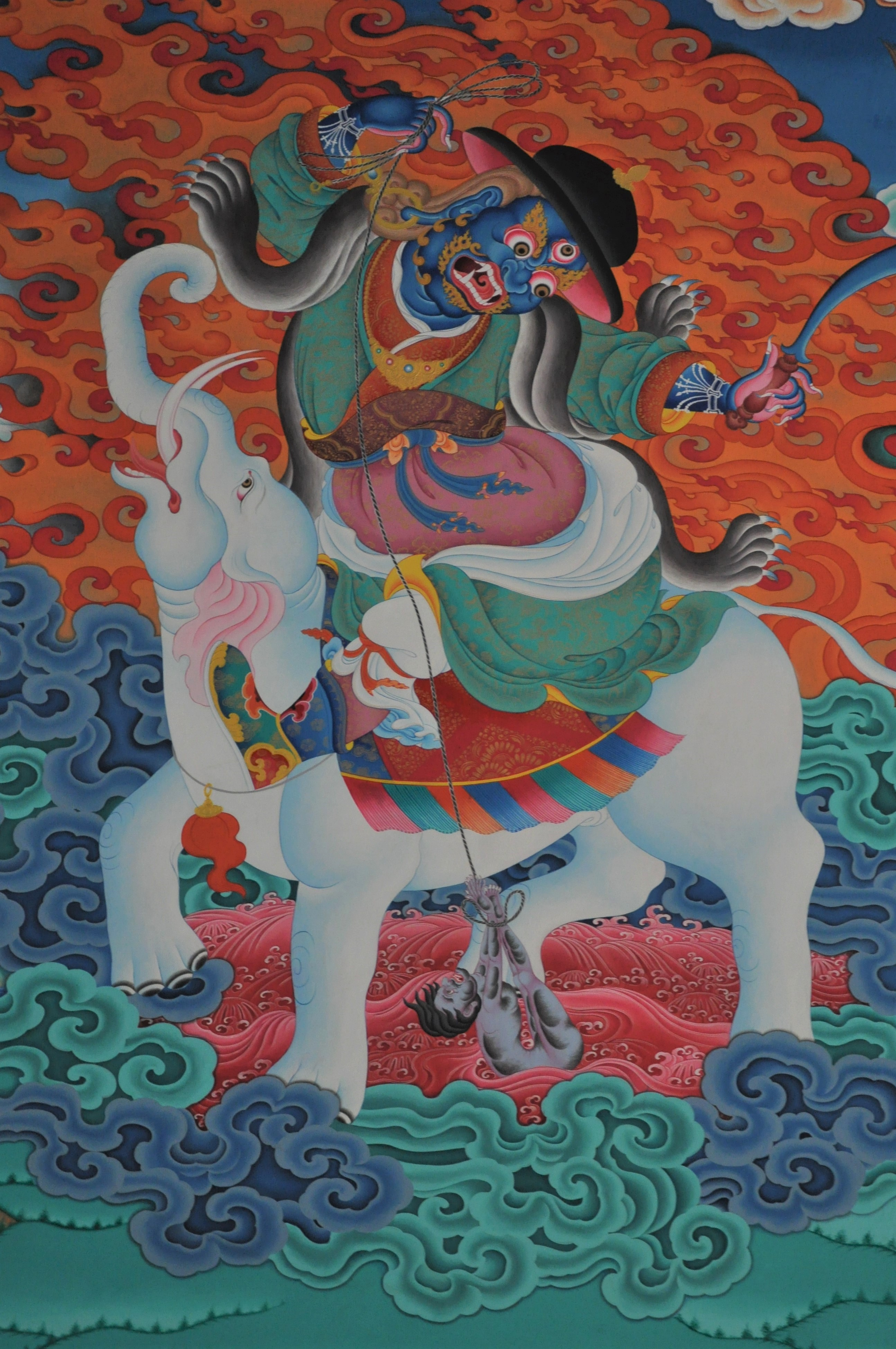
The Gompha has exquisite murals painted on its walls depicting deities of Vajrayana pantheon. This is the painting of Gyajin-Pehar a wrathful deity of NiyangmaPa pantheon. Gyajin is one of the Five forms of Gyalpo Pehar. Gyajin represents the mind, among the five. He is shown riding an elephant.

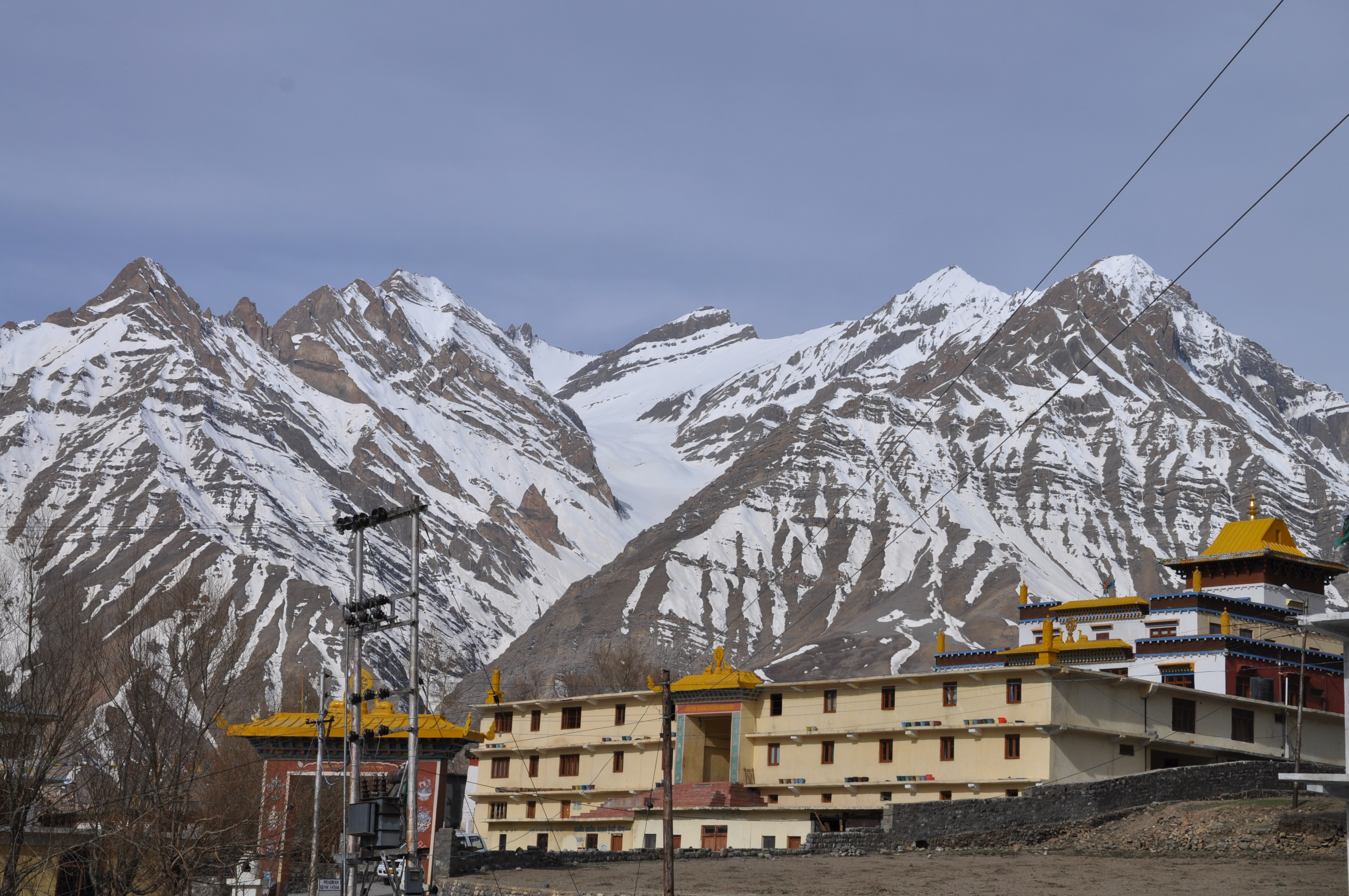
The Gompha has exquisite murals painted on its walls depicting deities of Vajrayana pantheon.

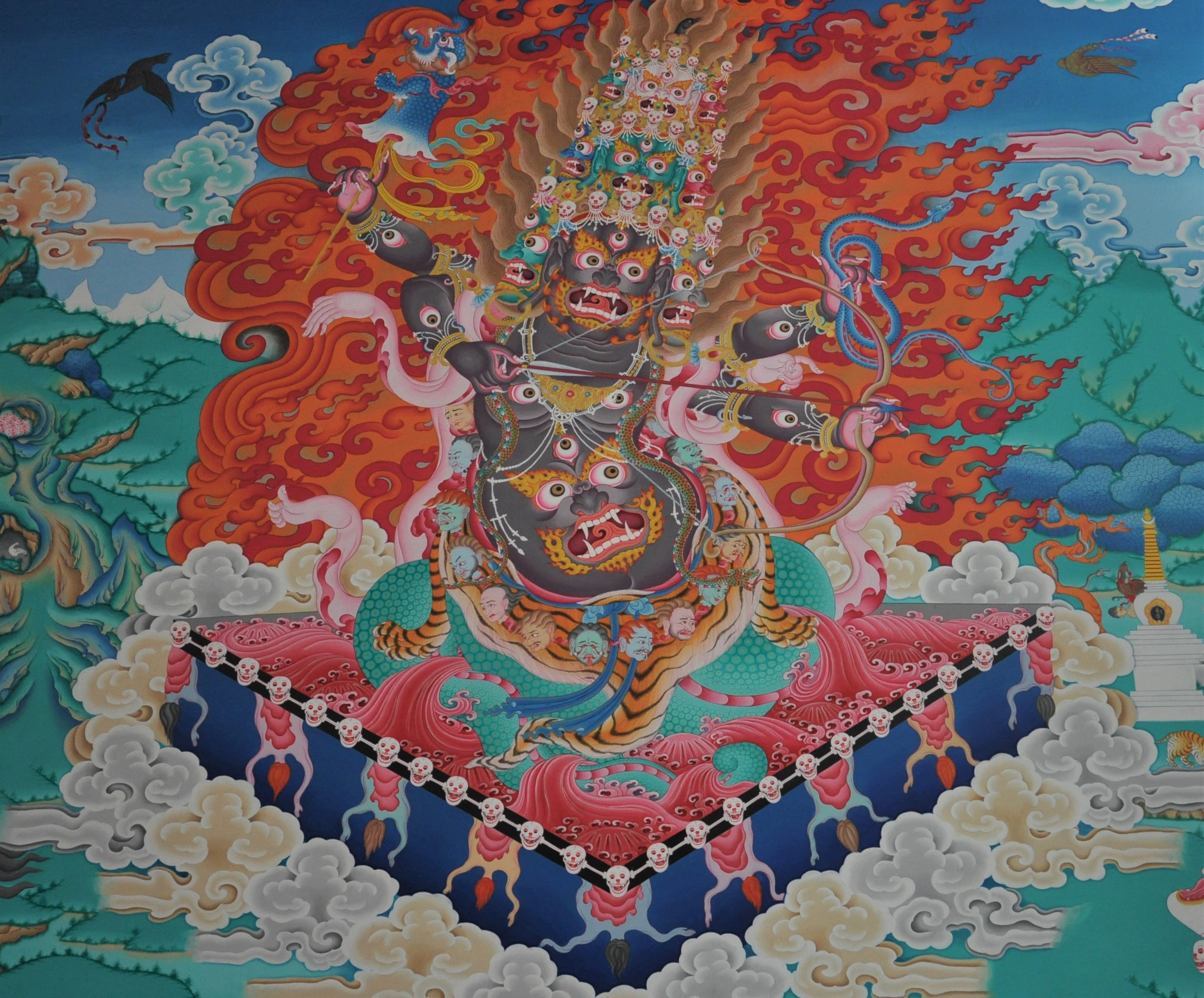
Kungri Gompha has exquisite murals painted on its walls depicting deities of Vajrayana pantheon. This is a painting of Rahula, a wrathful deity. He is identified with face on the stomach, lower body of serpent and a thousand eyes. He is the protector of all treasures (knowledge personified).

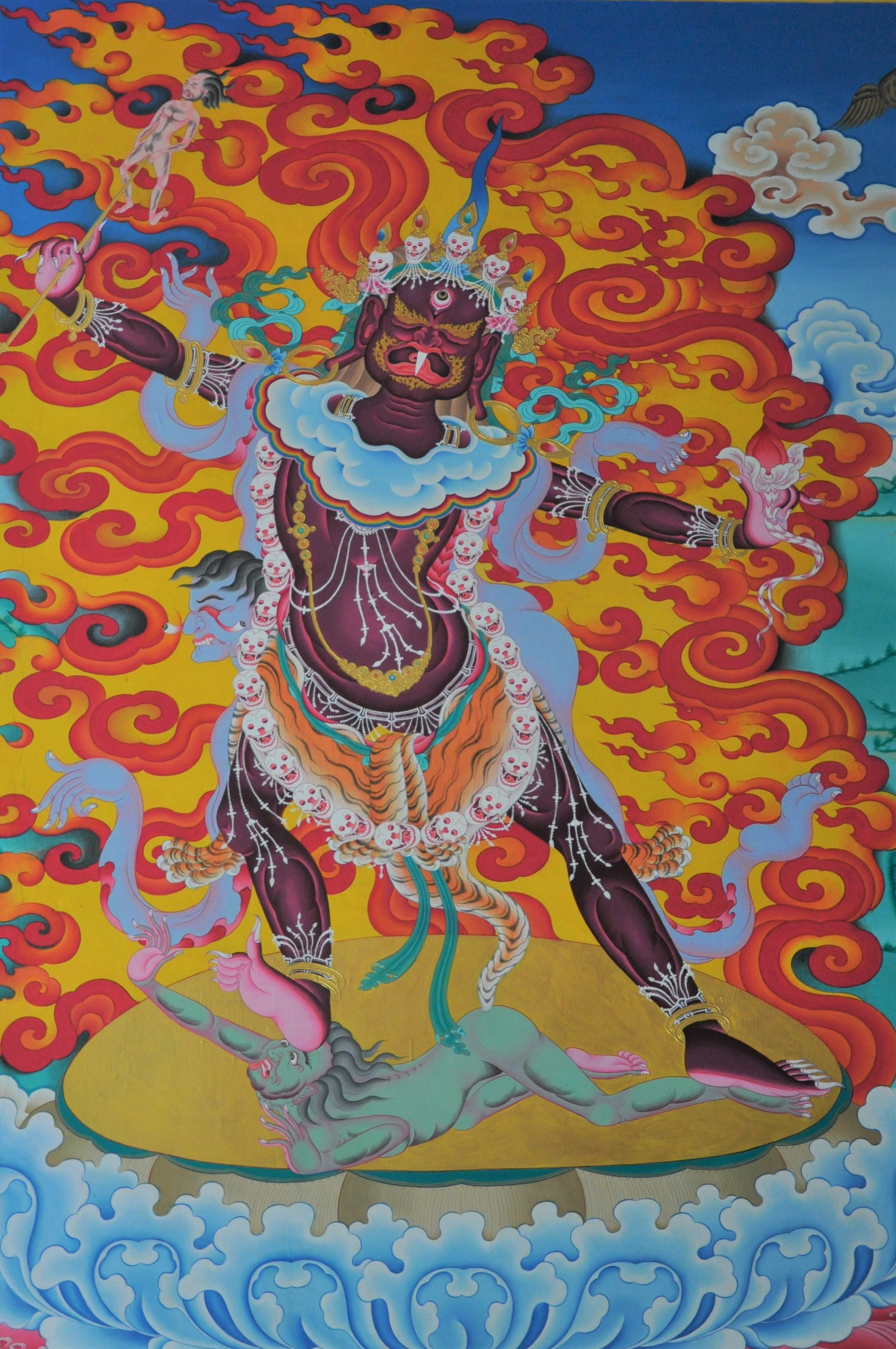
Painting of Ekajati, the wrathful deity of NiyangmaPa pantheon. Ekajati, the female deity is a protector and mother of Mahakala. She is identified with one eye, one mouth, one breast, one plait/ braid.

Kungri Monastery is a Buddhist monastery of the Nyingma sect of Tibetan Buddhism in the Pin Valley in Lahul and Spiti, Himachal Pradesh, northern India.

Kungri is Spiti's second oldest monastery, built around 1330. The gompa consists of three detached rectangular blocks facing east.

It is noted for its sword dance by the buzhens of Mud village on the right bank of the Pin River. H.E Rinpoche la at Urgyan Sangnag Choling Monastery (Kungri Gompa, Pin Valley, Spiti).
