= List of Buddhist temples in India =

This is a list of Buddhist temples, monasteries, stupas, and pagodas in India for which there are Wikipedia articles, sorted by location.

== Andhra Pradesh ==
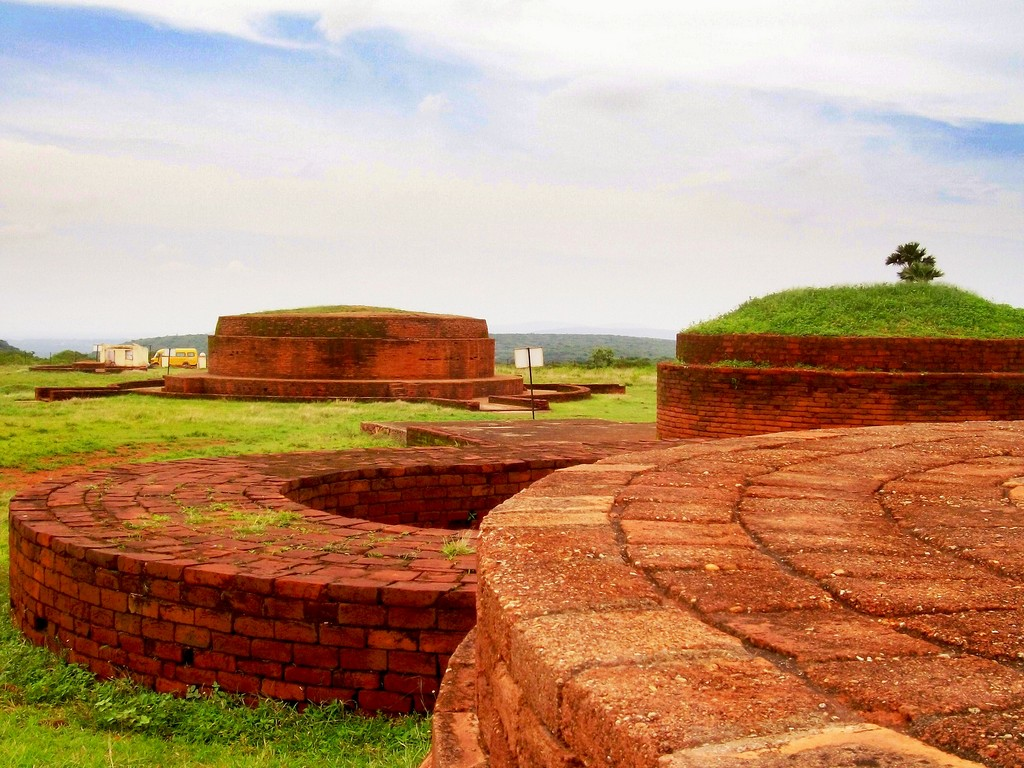
Bavikonda stupas, Andhra Pradesh

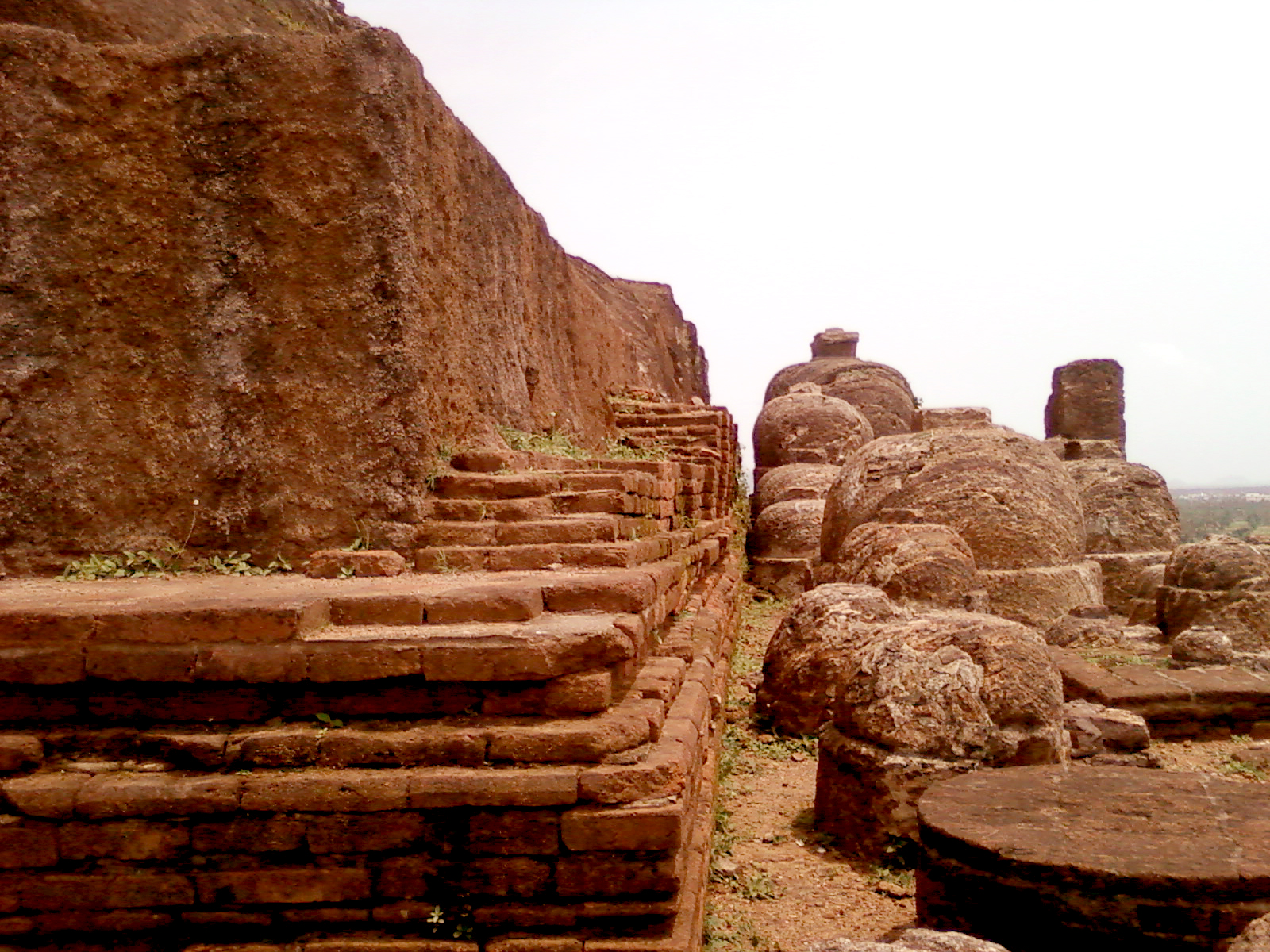
Stupas at Bojjannakonda in Andhra Pradesh

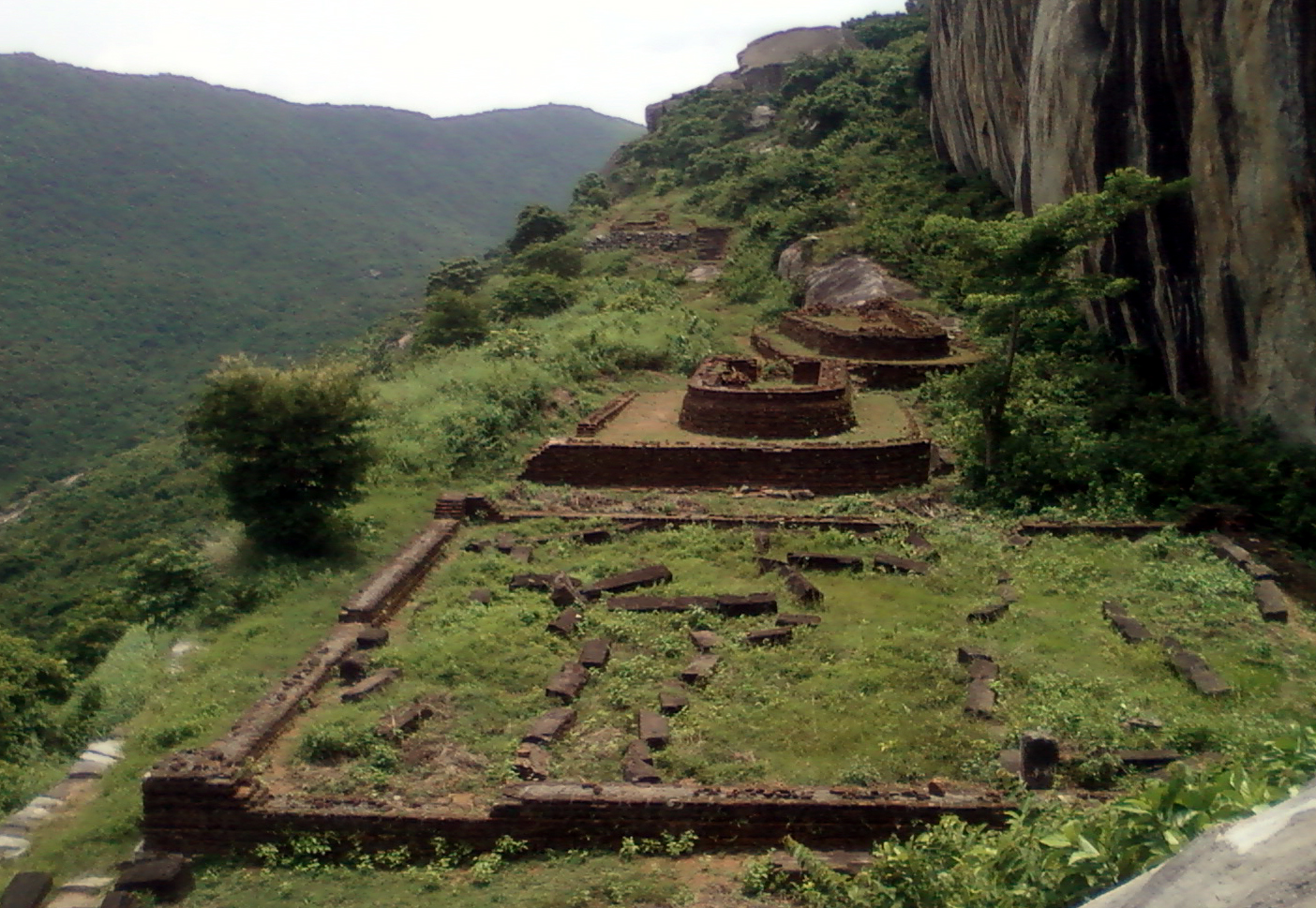
Buddhist Monastery Remnants, Ramatheertham, Andhra Pradesh

- Amaravati
- Bavikonda
- Bojjannakonda
- Nagarjunakonda
- Pavurallakonda
- Phanigiri
- Ramatheertham
- Salihundam
- Thotlakonda

== Arunachal Pradesh ==
- Golden Pagoda, Namsai
- Rigyalling Monastery
- Tawang Monastery
- Tawang Taktshang Monastery
- Urgelling Monastery

== Bihar ==
- Mahabodhi Temple Complex at Bodh Gaya
- Nalanda
- Rajgir

== Goa ==
Buddhist caves exist in following places in Goa:

- Arambol (Harahara)
- Bandora (Bandivataka)
- Margao (Mathagrama)
- Rivona (Rishivana)

Buddha images have been found in several places, and some temples, some are still in worship and are considered now as Hindu gods. Monasteries used to exist in many places, and it can be seen from the names of the modern villages. For example, Viharas have been found in modern Divachali or ancient Dipakavishaya, Lamgaon or ancient Lamagrama and many other places.

== Himachal Pradesh ==
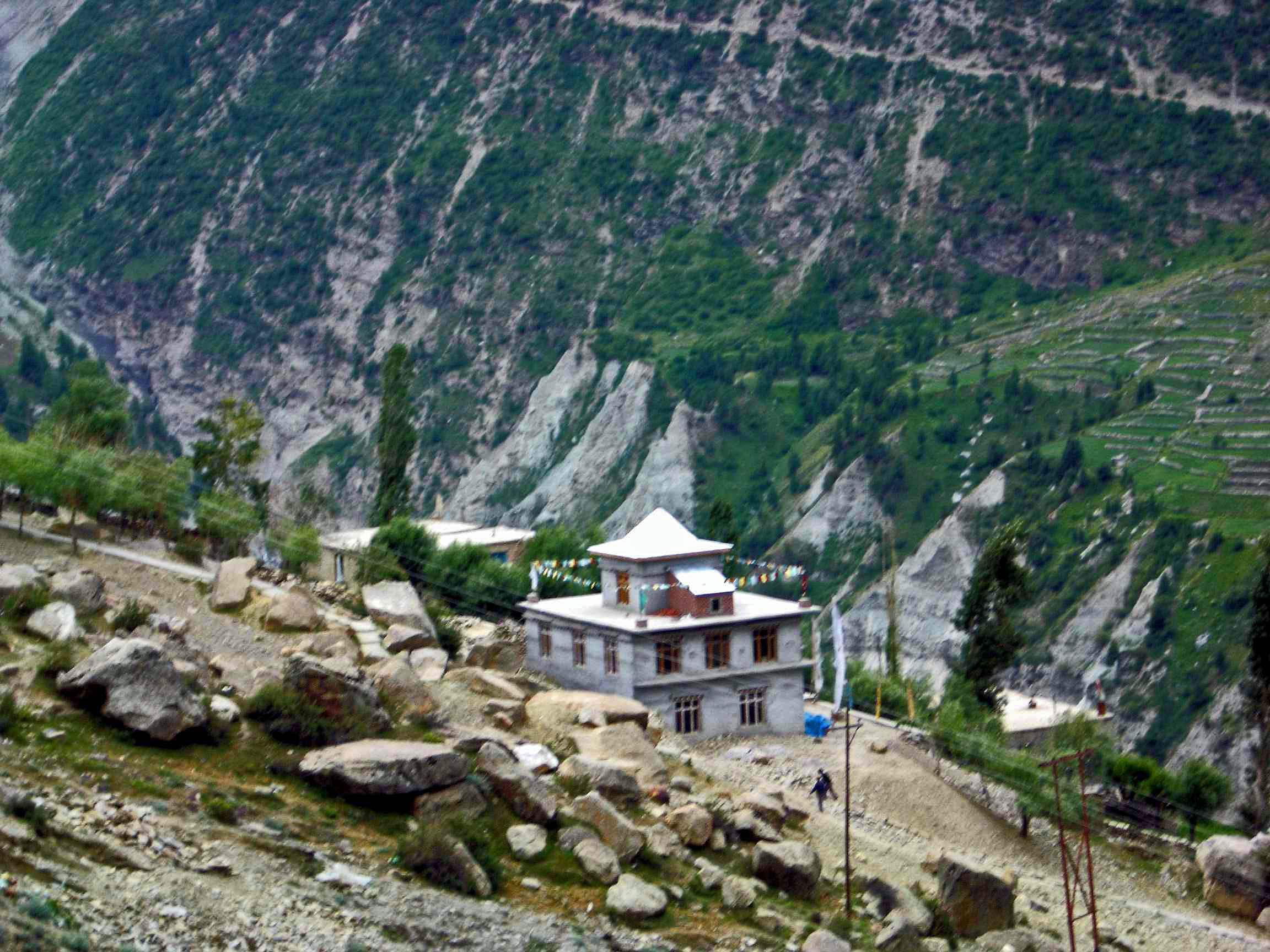
Gandhola Monastery, Lahaul, Himachal Pradesh

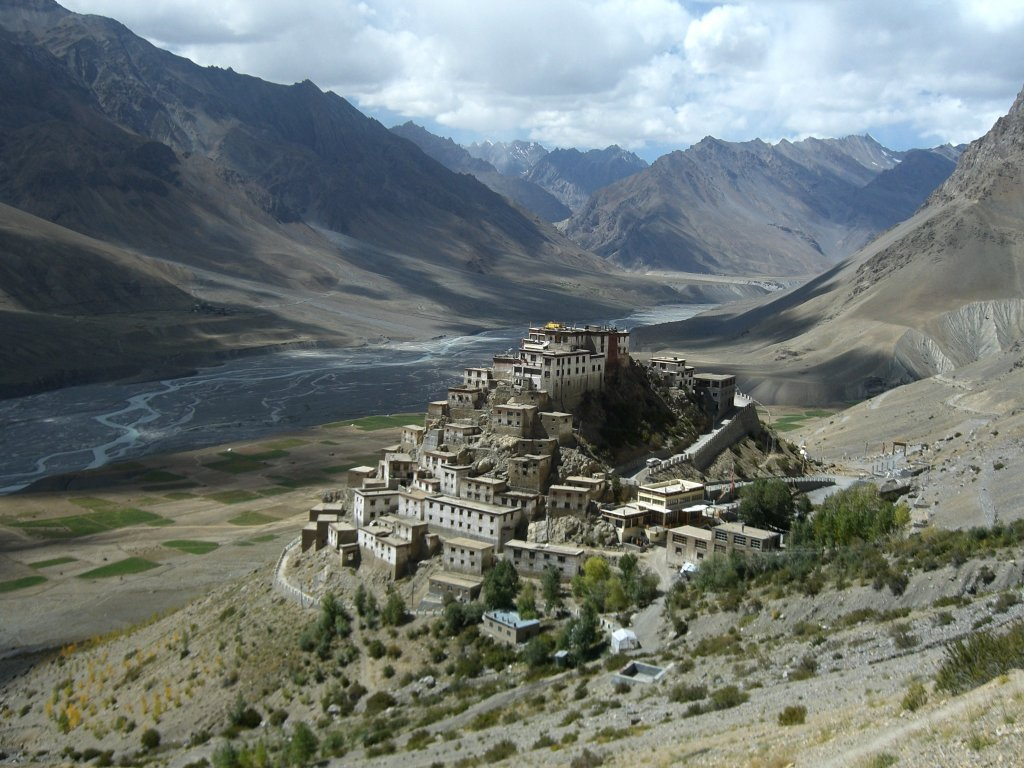
Key Monastery, Spiti, Himachal Pradesh

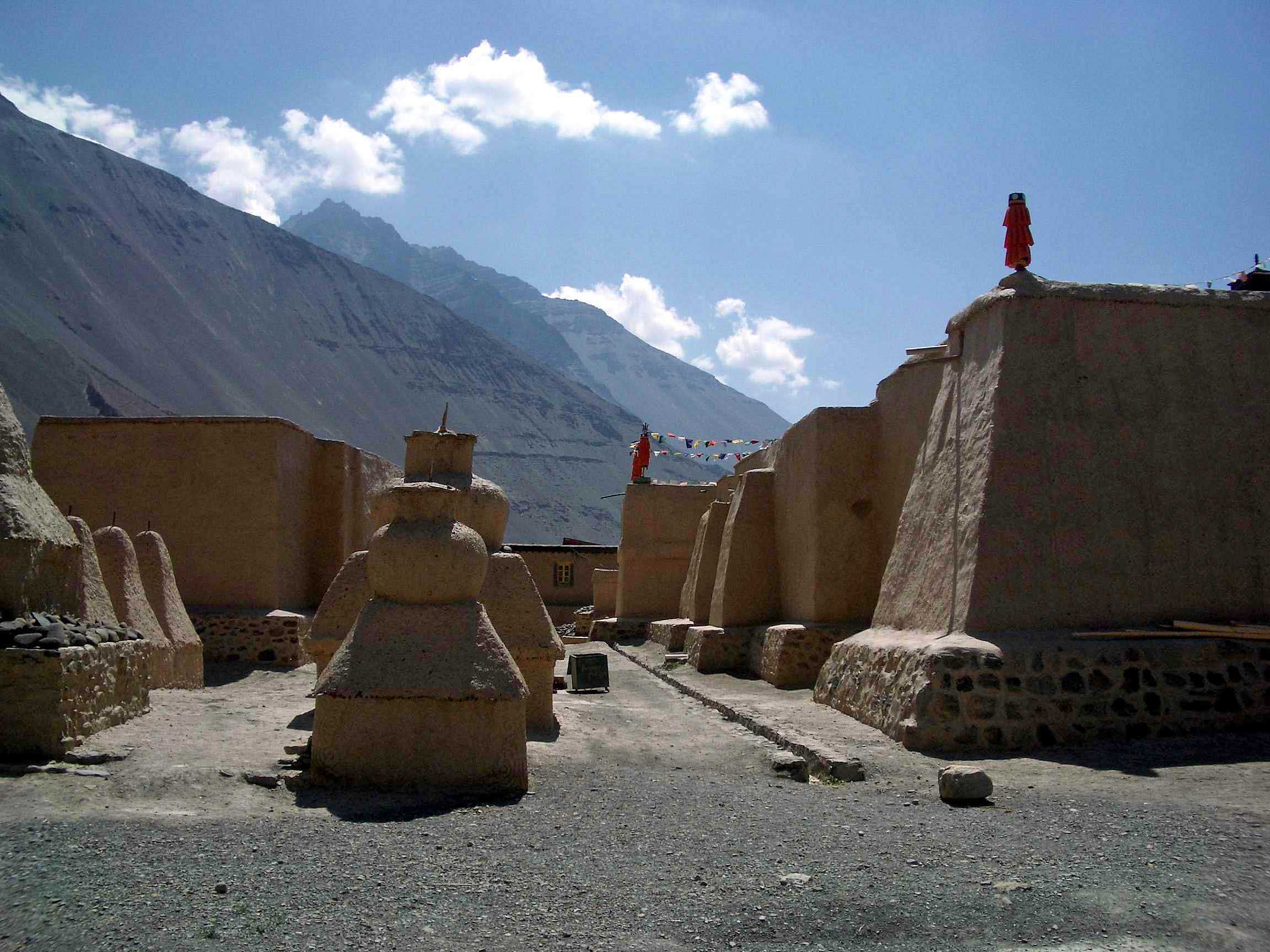
Tabo Monastery, Spiti, Himachal Pradesh

- Dhankar Gompa
- Gandhola Monastery
- Gemur Monastery
- Kardang Monastery
- Key Monastery
- Kibber
- Kungri Monastery
- Lhalung Monastery
- Namgyal Monastery
- Rewalsar
- Shashur Monastery
- Tabo Monastery
- Tangyud Monastery
- Tayul Monastery

== Jammu and Kashmir ==
- Dzongkhul Monastery

=== Ladakh ===
- Alchi Monastery
- Bardan Monastery
- Basgo Monastery
- Chemrey Monastery
- Diskit Monastery
- Hanle Monastery
- Hemis Monastery
- Hundur Monastery
- Korzok Monastery
- Kursha Monastery
- Lamayuru Monastery
- Likir Monastery
- Lingshed Monastery
- Mashro Monastery
- Matho Monastery
- Mulbekh Monastery
- Namgyal Tsemo Monastery
- Phugtal Monastery
- Phyang Monastery
- Rangdum Monastery
- Rizong Monastery
- Sani Monastery
- Sankar Monastery
- Shey Monastery
- Spituk Monastery
- Stakna Monastery
- Stok Monastery
- Stongdey Monastery
- Sumda Chun
- Takthok Monastery
- Thikse Monastery
- Zangla Monastery

== Karnataka ==
- Namdroling Monastery

== Kerala ==
- Karumadikkuttan

== Madhya Pradesh ==
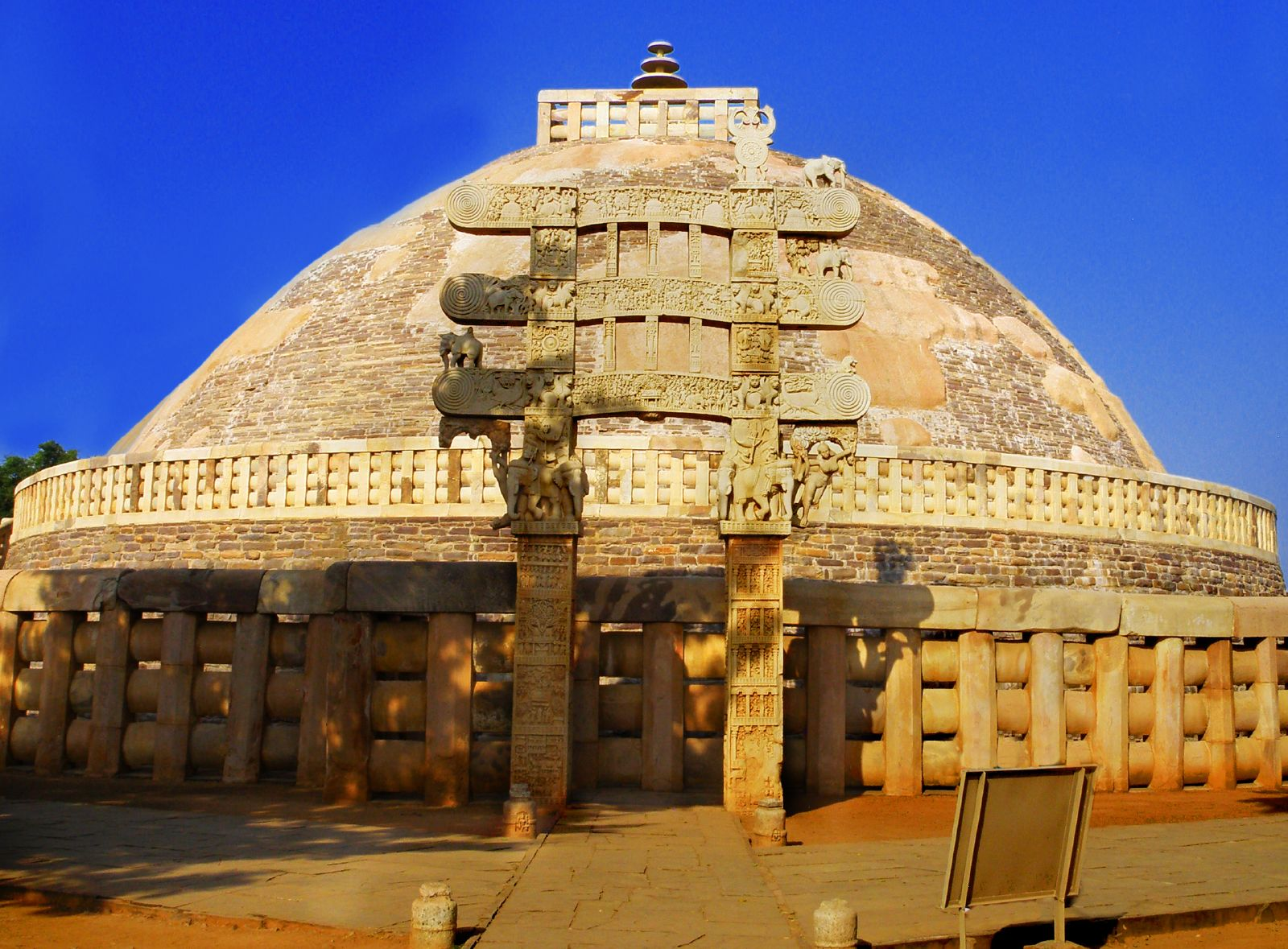
Sanchi

- Deur Kothar
- Sanchi

== Maharashtra ==
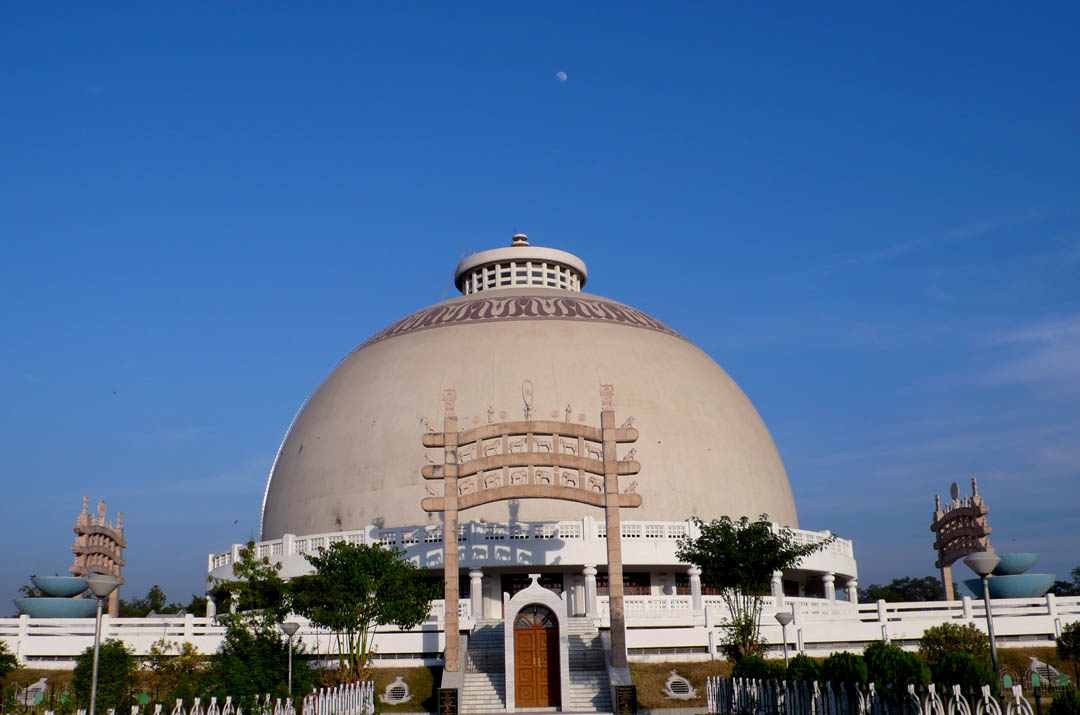
Deekshabhoomi, Buddhism revival place in India

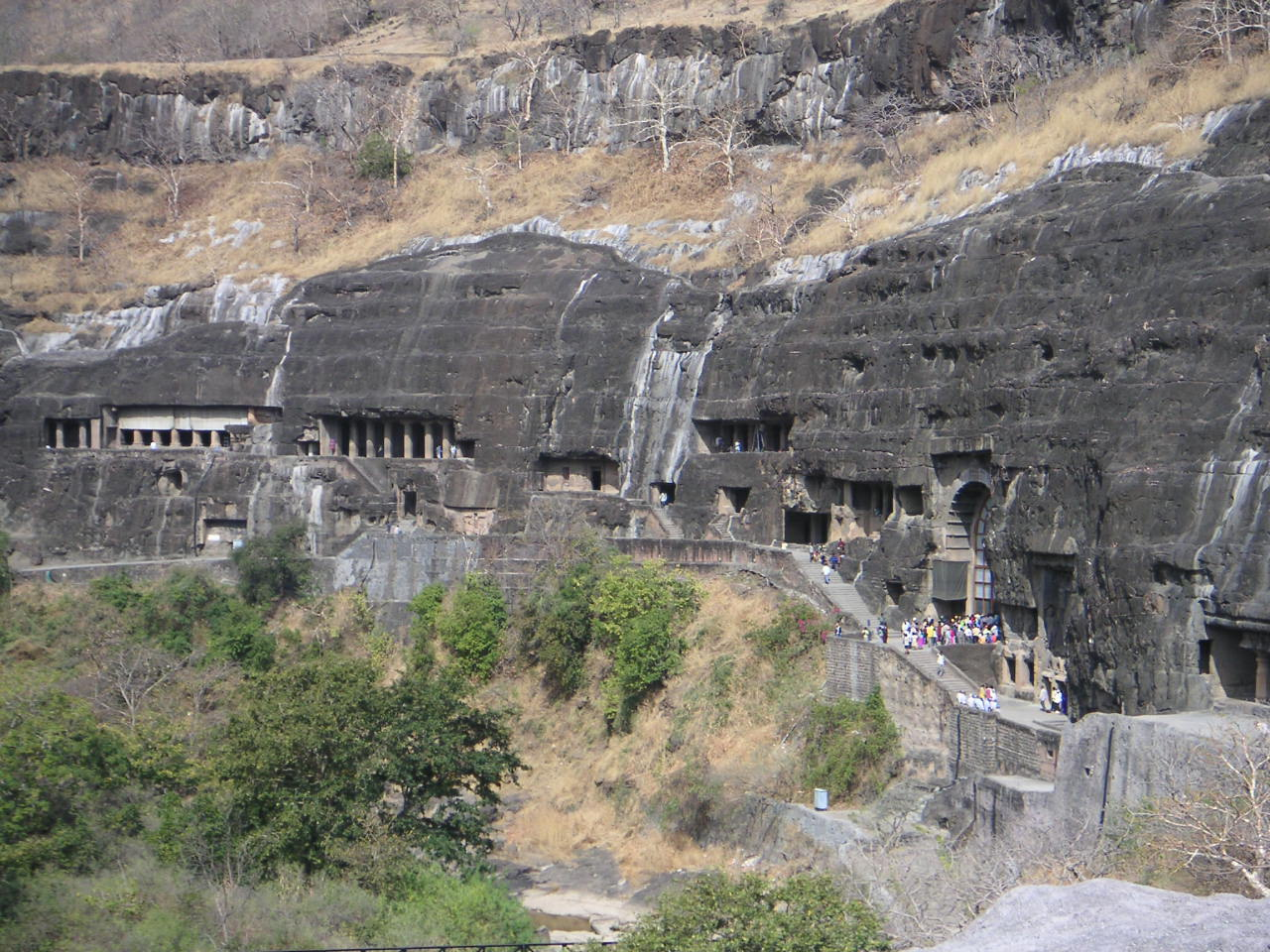
Ajanta Caves

- Ajanta Caves
- Aurangabad Caves
- Bedse Caves
- Bhaja Caves
- Chaitya Bhoomi
- Deekshabhoomi
- Dragon Palace Temple
- Ellora Caves
- Ghorawadi Caves
- Global Vipassana Pagoda
- Jogeshwari Caves
- Kanheri Caves
- Karla Caves
- Mahakali Caves
- Pandavleni Caves
- Statue of Equality
- Vishwa Shanti Stupa, Wardha

== Manipur ==
- Buddhist Temple Moreh

== Orissa ==
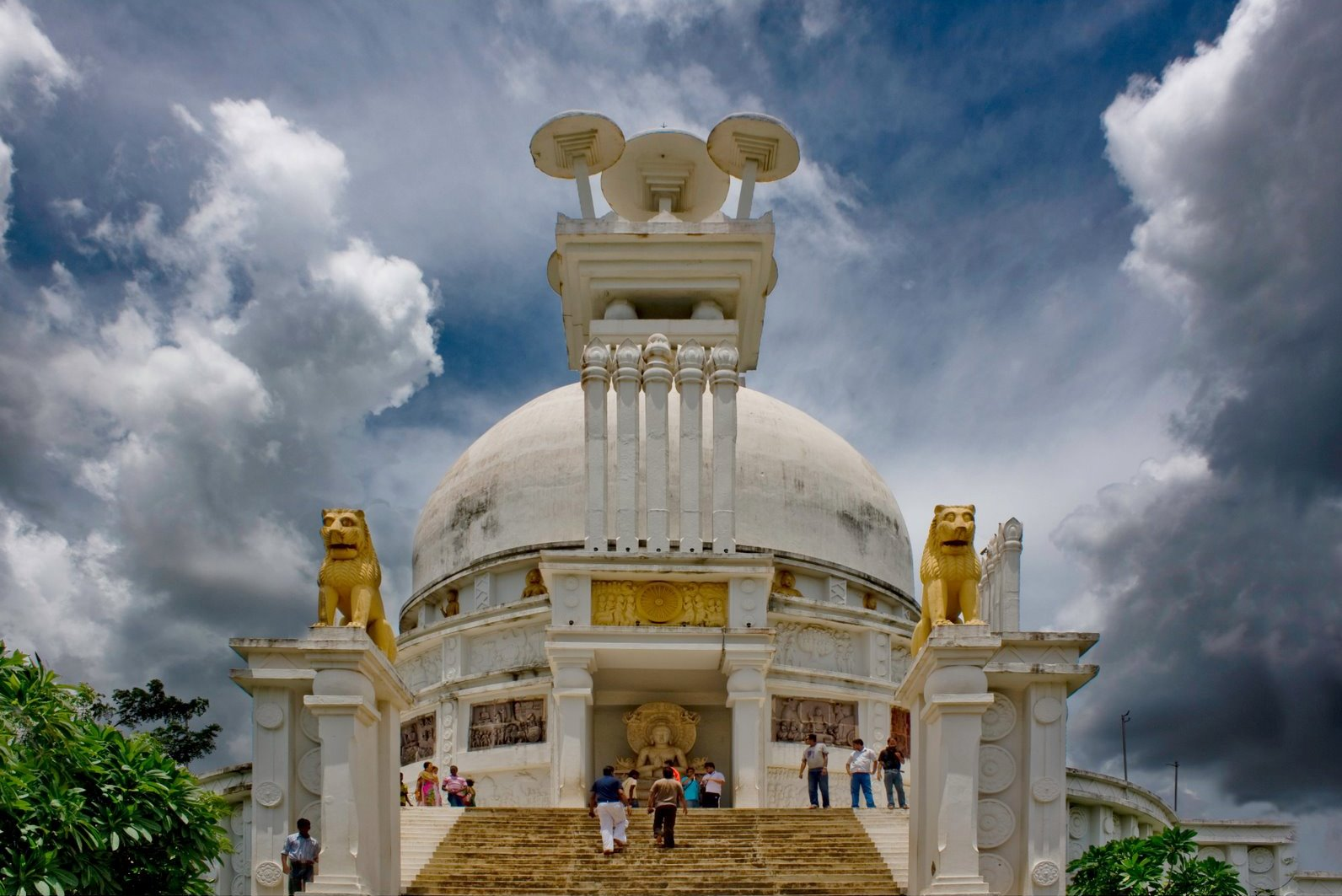
Dhauli, Orissa

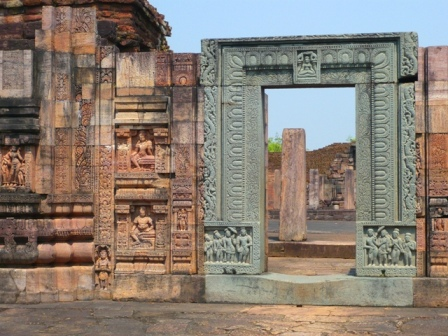
Ratnagiri (Orissa)

- Brahmani temple
- Dhauli
- Lalitgiri
- Marichi temple
- Puspagiri Mahavihara
- Ratnagiri (Orissa)
- Udayagiri (Orissa)
- Udayagiri and Khandagiri Caves

== Sikkim ==
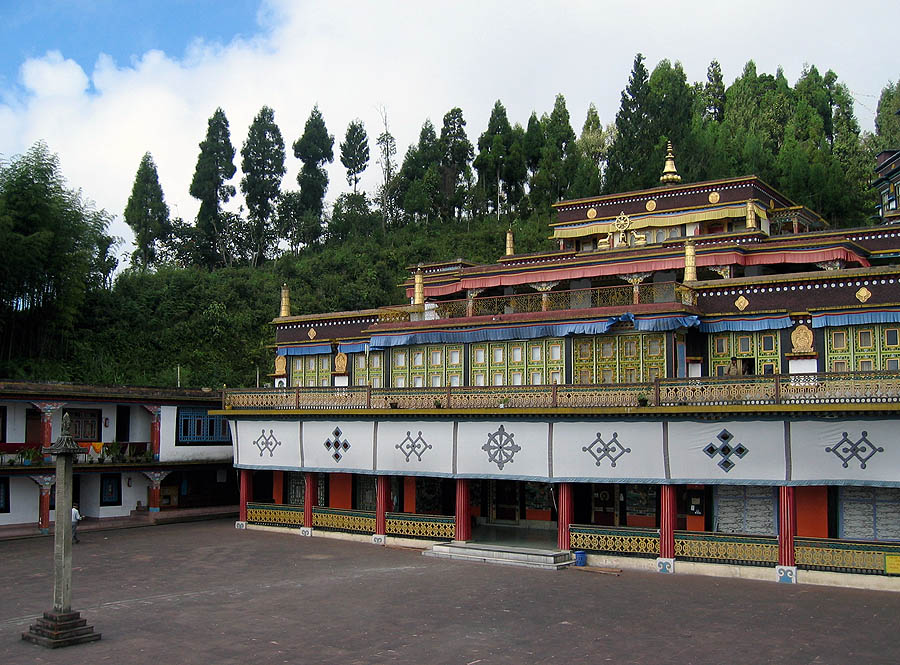
Rumtek Monastery, Sikkim

- Dubdi Monastery
- Enchey Monastery
- Pemayangtse Monastery
- Phensang Monastery
- Phodang Monastery
- Ralang Monastery
- Rumtek Monastery
- Tashiding Monastery
- Tsuklakhang Palace

== Tamil Nadu ==
- Chudamani Vihara
- Sri Lanka Maha Bodhi Centre, Chennai
- Buddha Temple, Perunjeri, Mayiladuthurai

== Uttar Pradesh ==
- Chaukhandi Stupa
- Dhamek Stupa
- Jetavana, Sravasti
- Kushinagar
- Parinirvana Stupa: Death (Nirvana) place of Gautama Buddha.
- Sankissa
- Sarnath
- Varanasi

== West Bengal ==
- Bauddha Dharmankur Sabha, Kolkata

=== Darjeeling district ===
- Bhutia Busty Monastery, Darjeeling
- Ghum Monastery, Darjeeling
- Mag-Dhog Yolmowa Monastery, Darjeeling
- Tharpa Choling Monastery, Kalimpong
- Zang Dhok Palri Phodang, Kalimpong

== See also ==
- Buddhism in India
- Bengali Buddhists
- Marathi Buddhists
- Dalit Buddhist movement
- Buddhist Society of India
- Bengal Buddhist Association
- Barua Buddhist Institutes in India and Bangladesh
- Lord Buddha TV
- Sambuddhatva jayanthi
- Buddhist pilgrimage sites in India
- List of Buddhist temples
- Decline of Buddhism in the Indian subcontinent
