= Buddha Temple, Buddhamangalam =

Buddhist temple in Tamil Nadu, India

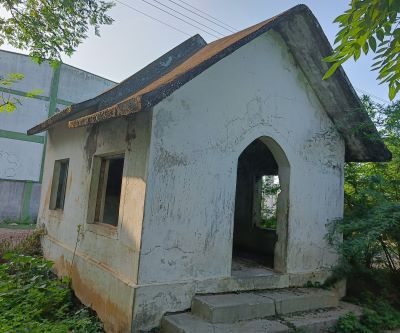
Buddha Temple, Buddhamangalam

The Buddha Temple is a temple dedicated to Buddha, at Buddhamangalam, Nagapattinam district, Tamil Nadu, India.

== Location ==
This temple, one of the Buddha temples in Tamil Nadu, is located at Buddhamangalam in Kilvelur taluk of Nagapattinam district. This is one of the earlier Buddhist centres of Tamil Nadu.

== Statue ==
The Buddha statue in this temple is found in sitting posture on a pedestal. The face is not clear. The temple is not maintained now.
