= Shey Monastery =

Building in India

Shey Palace and Monastery

- Location within Ladakh Location within India

Religion
- Affiliation: Tibetan Buddhism

Location
- Location: Shey, Leh district, Ladakh, India
- Coordinates: 34°04′18″N 77°37′58″E

Architecture
- Founder: Deldan Namgyal
- Shey Monastery is within the Shey Palace complex.

Shey Monastery or Gompa or the Shey Palace are complex structures located on a hillock in Shey, 15 kilometres (9.3 mi) to the south of Leh in Ladakh, northern India on the Leh-Manali road. Shey was the summer capital of Ladakh in the past. It contains a huge Shakyamuni Buddha statue. It is the second largest Buddha statue in Ladakh.

The original palace, now in ruins, was built near the Shey village by Lhachen Palgyigon, the king of Ladakh (then called Maryul), in the 10th century. The Moghul noble Mirza Haidar Dughlat stayed here during his invasion of Ladakh in the 16th century.

The later Shey Palace and Monastery were also built in 1655 on the instructions of Deldan Namgyal, in memory of his father, Sengge Namgyal, below the first palace. The monastery is noted for its giant copper with gilded gold statue of a seated Shakyamuni Buddha. The statue is so named since Buddha was the sage (muni) of the Sakya people who resided in the Himalayan foothills and their capital was Kapilvastu. It is said to be the second largest such statue in Ladakh.

== History ==
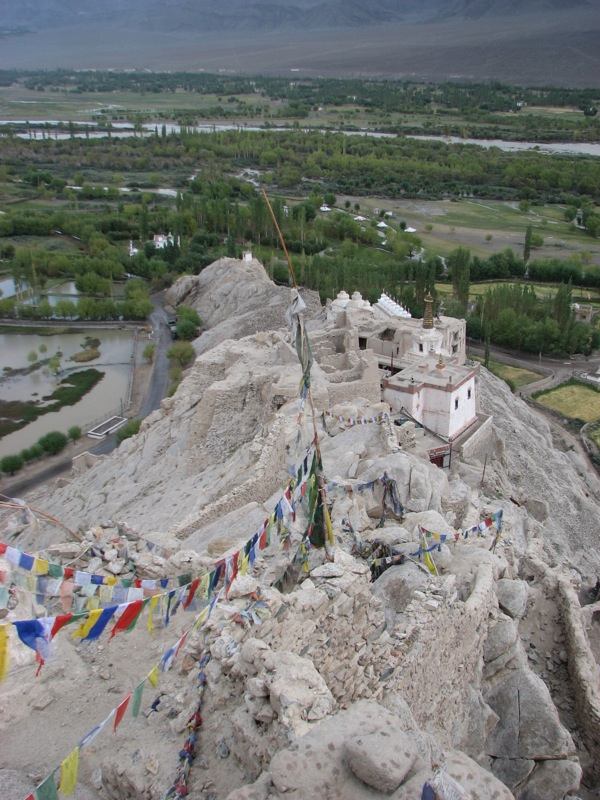
View of the palace and valley

Shey was the old capital of the upper Ladakh region. When the Dogras of Jammu invaded Ladakh in 1842, the Namgyals abandoned the palace and fled to Stok (they made it their permanent residence) on the opposite side of the Indus River. It is conjectured that the fort found in ruins, not dated, above the present palace at Shey, belonged to this period of invasion. Subsequently, when the political dictates necessitated shifting of the capital to Leh, even then the importance of Shey continued since it was a mandatory requirement of the Namgyal kings to father their heir apparent here.

== Geography and visitor information ==
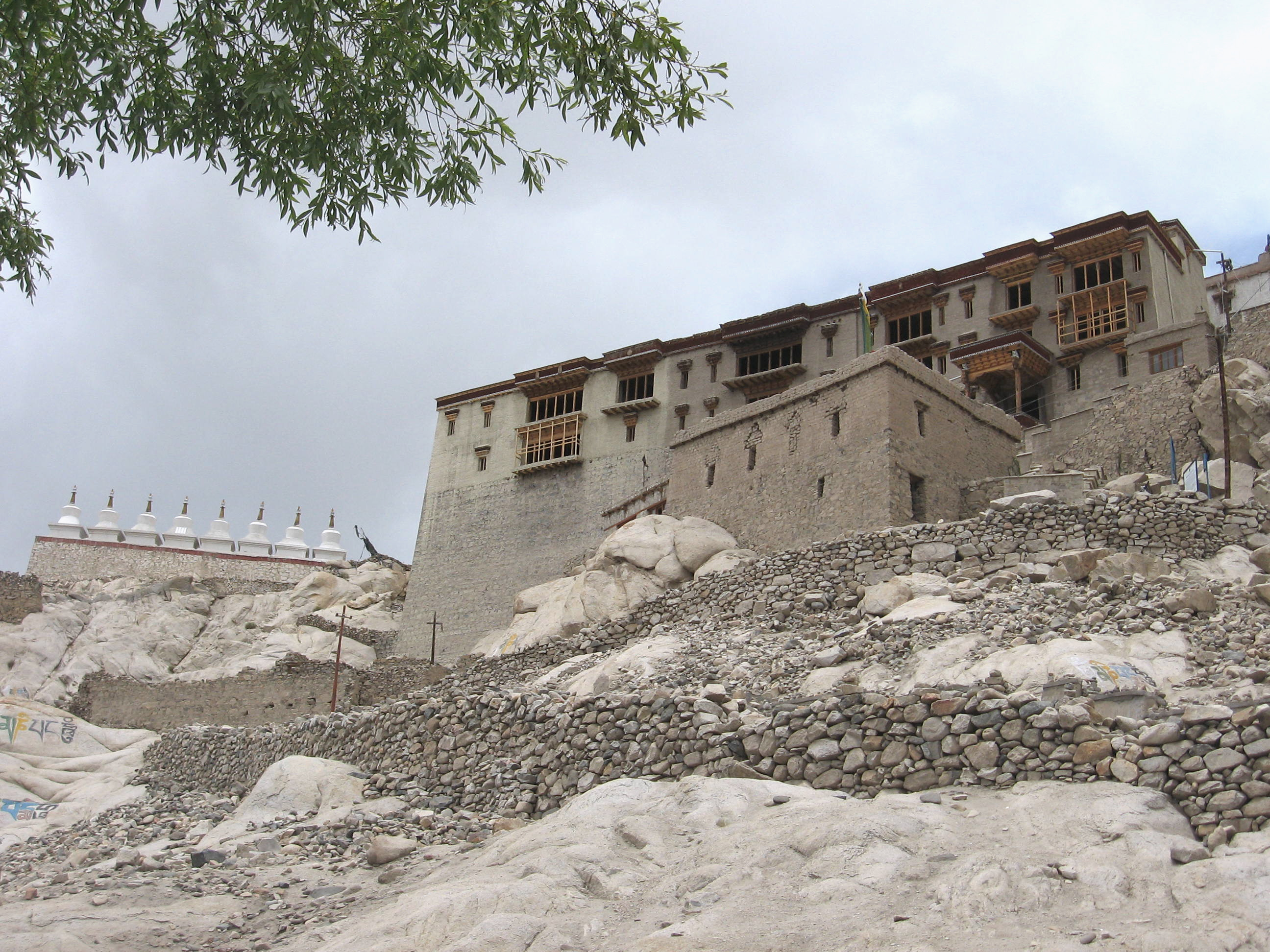
Closer view of Shey Palace and chortens (stupas) nearby

Shey Monastery is located in the upper Indus Valley, just 15 kilometres (9.3 mi) east of the modern capital of Ladakh, Leh. The Zanskar range of hills is on its southern side in the fertile Indus River valley. It has an average elevation of 11,204 feet (3,415 m).

Shey is located on the road from Leh to Thikse Monastery. Many monasteries, stupas and rock carvings can be seen on this road. It can be approached by trekking 4 kilometres (2.5 mi) from Thiksey and the path is known as: "for having Ladakh's biggest chorten fields with hundreds of whitewashed shrines of varying sizes scattered across the desert landscape."

The nearest airport is at Leh. Special permission is essential to visit the monastery, as only one lama resides here and the inner sanctum is usually closed. On a lane, opposite to the Shey palace there is a hotel for visitors, which is surrounded by flowered gardens.

== Architecture ==
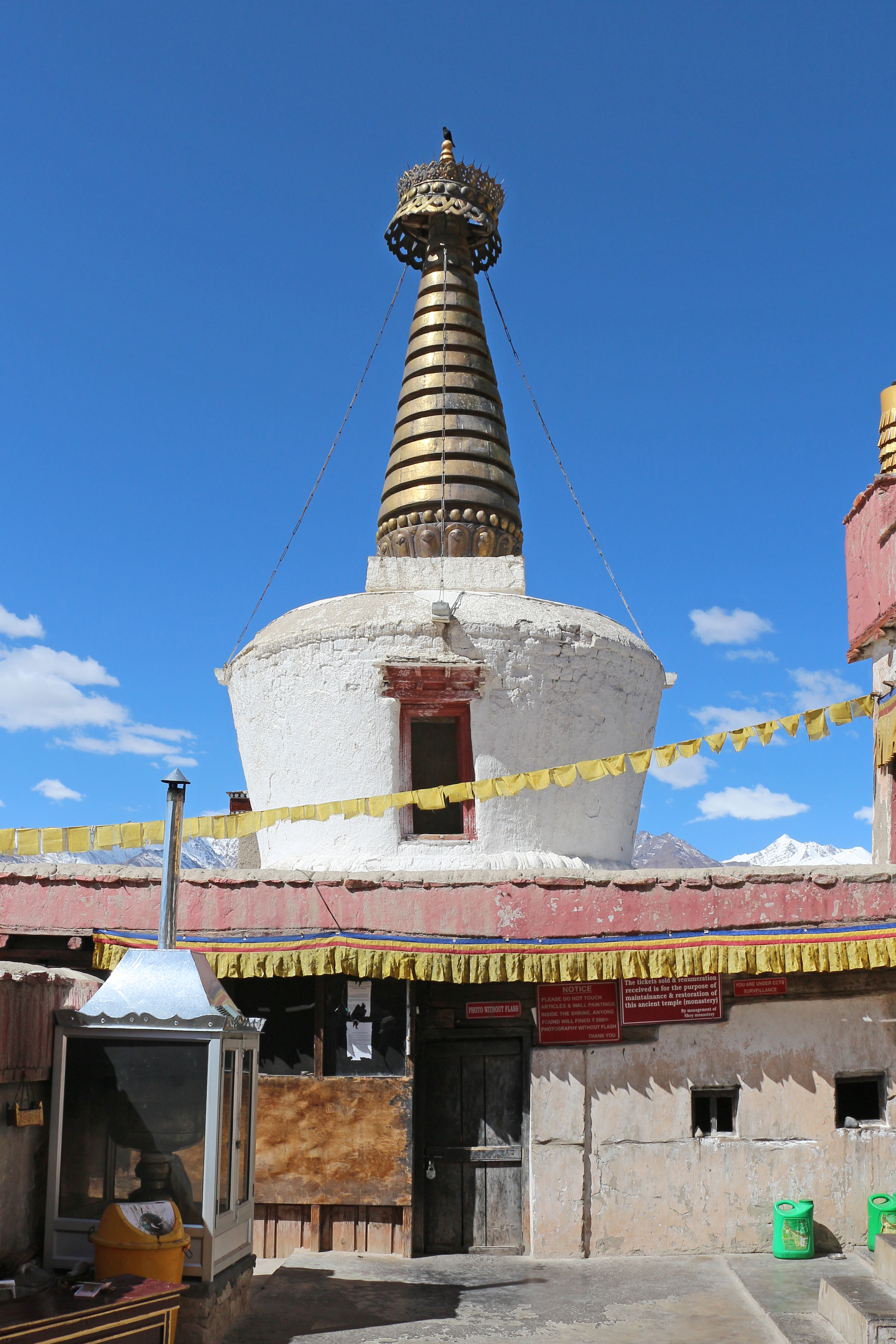
Main chorten of the palace

The main Shakyamuni Buddha statue in the monastery is a 12 metres (39 ft) icon covering three floors of the monastery. The giant Buddha as seen in the monastery is on three levels; the lowest level shows his huge feet and "soles pointing upwards" and a mural of Shambunath, the middle floor shows murals of the Buddha in different postures and the upper floor is darkened by the soot of the butter lamps that burn eternally at the altar.

The statue was first cast in parts, in Leh, at a place known as Zanstin. 'Zans' means "copper" and 'til' means "hammer". The copper plates used in the statue were made from copper, collected from Lingshet mines and other villages of the Zanskar area. The plates from the copper ingots were made by hammering them on a nearby rock. It was first built in parts and then transported to the palace for installation. It is said that about 5 kilograms of gold was used for gilding the copper plates of the statue in the main monastery.

On the upper floor of monastery, a number of beautiful wall paintings are displayed. The lower floor has a library with many neatly preserved manuscripts and is decorated with murals of Buddha figures in various mudras (hand gestures).

About 400 metres (1,300 ft) from the palace, there is another small shrine built by Sengge Namgyal. This shrine also houses another large statue of Shakyamuni Buddha in a sitting posture. Here also, the murals and images inside are similar to the palace shrine. It is recorded that this statue and the other one in the main monastery were crafted by a Nepalese sculptor named Sanga Zargar Wanduk. He was reportedly brought here by Sengge's mother, Gyal Khatun, not only to build this statue but also the main statue in the palace. Paldana Shering Gyaso, Gamani Jal Shring and Nakbiri were other craftsmen who assisted him. It is reported that in an isolated village called Chilling the descendants of these craftsmen live and are now known for their craftsmanship in conventional silverware.

The small shrine also depicts murals, which represent the 16 Arhats, original disciples of the Buddha, together with some of the renowned teachers like Padmasambhava, Atisa and Tson-Ka-Pa. Near to this shrine, two small Tantric shrines also exist. Close to this shrine, carvings are seen on rock spurs on the road to the palace. These rock carvings are of the five Dhyani Buddhas; one of them is very large and close to the palace while the other four are located close to a chorten. Also seen are many chortens to the east of the palace.

At the edge of the valley, there is photong (official residence) of the Lama of the monastery from where there are scenic views of the Indus valley. The small palace is, however, dilapidated and is much smaller than the Leh palace. It is located below an abandoned fort. It has a golden chorten spire. But its importance is now more due to the Buddha deified in the monastery.

Perched on top of the hill, the monastery commands panoramic view of the surroundings of Thikse, Stakna, Matho, Stok and also Leh.

== Worship ==
Shakyamuni Buddha in Shey Monastery
Front view	Side view

The offerings placed for worship in front of the deities in the sanctum are grain, jewels, holy signs and with mantars (holy chants inscribed inside it.

A number of butter lit lamps are placed in the shrine, which burn perpetually over a full year and are then replaced to continue the flame without interruption. It is a symbolic significance of the divinity and purity of the shrine.

=== Festivals ===
There are two seasonal festivals held here every year. The first festival is held at Shey Palace on the 26th and 27th day of the first month of the Tibetan calendar corresponding to July or August month of the Gregorian calendar. This festival is called "Shey Doo Lhoo" to mark the beginning of the sowing season. The two day monastic celebration is marked by special rituals performed by the monks in the main monastery, in addition to several other religious rites. Villagers throng to the monastery in large numbers in a spirit of celebration and hope. During this festival, an oracle reader who visits the monastery on a horse back, conducts a three-day prayer, and then goes into trance. In this state of trance, he is said to give prophesies.

The second festival is called the "Shey Rupla" and marks the harvesting season. On this occasion farmers offer the first fruits of the corn at the monastery. A dance called the "Rhupla dance" is performed by two men in tiger costumes. Other forms of folk dances are also performed. Two soothsayers also visit the festival and give out oracles.

There is a belief that women without children offer special prayers here to Buddha seeking blessings to beget children.

== Funerals ==
Close to the palace is the funeral ground. The dead are carried in a chair after due rites are performed at home. The body is placed on a sedan chair and carried to the funeral ground in a procession of lamas and the common people of the village. The chair is then laid in a "tubular walled oven", as prayers are chanted. The ashes are later scattered in the river.

== See also ==
- List of buddhist monasteries in Ladakh
- Geography of Ladakh
- Tourism in Ladakh
- World Monuments Fund

== Bibliography ==
- Lo Bue, Erberto; Bray, John, eds. (2014), "Introduction", Art and Architecture in Ladakh: Cross-cultural Transmissions in the Himalayas and Karakoram, BRILL, ISBN 978-90-04-27180-7
  - Dorjay, Phuntsog (2014), "Embedded in Stone—Early Buddhist Rock Art of Ladakh", Ibid, pp. 35–67, ISBN 9789004271807
  - Howard, Neil; Howard, Kath (2014), "Historic Ruins in the Gya Valley, Eastern Ladakh, and a Consideration of Their Relationship to the History of Ladakh and Maryul", Ibid, pp. 68–99, ISBN 9789004271807
- Kaul, H. N. (1998), Rediscovery of Ladakh, Indus Publishing, ISBN 978-81-7387-086-6
