= Buddha Temple, Perunjeri =

Hindu temple in Tamil Nadu, India

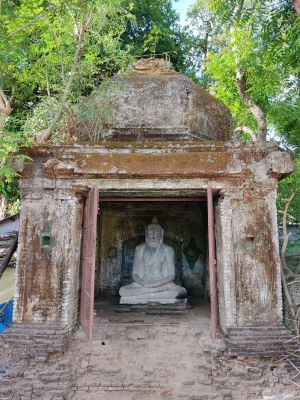
Buddha Temple, Perunjeri

The Buddha Temple is a temple dedicated to Buddha, at Perunjeri, Mayiladuthurai district, Tamil Nadu, India.

== Location ==
The temple is one of the Buddha temples in Tamil Nadu, and is located at Perunjeri in Mayiladuthurai-Thiruvarur road at a distance of 0.5 km in Sundrappanchavadi-Kilianur road.

== Statue ==
The Buddha statue in this temple is 5' and 3 inch height. In the pedestal of the statue, a not so clear Tamil inscription is found. Earlier this statue was found at a distance of one furlong from this place. The usual iconographical features such as coiled her, flame atop the head, elongated ears and upper garment are found in this statue.

== Rishi ==
Earlier, this temple was called as Rishi Temple.

== Worship ==
This temple is under worship now. Locals light lamp in this temple.
