= Perunchery =

Perunchery is a village located in the Mayiladuthurai Taluk, Mayiladuthurai district, Tamil Nadu, India. The village is 8 km from Mayiladuthurai. It's a village panchayat having around 2500 voters including the hamlets of Thargavanam, Sundarappansavadi and Mettupakkam. Agriculture is the major occupation and boreholes are the major source of water for irrigation in the village. People from various communities and religions live here and the population is 3157.(Male population:1568, Female population:1589)

== History ==
The name "Perum+cheri" means a "vast group" and the village was so named because it is said that there were 40,000 sages who lived in this village. They performed severe penance and thought that this would be sufficient to provide for their needs and that there was no superior god. To enrich their knowledge, Siva in the form of Bhikshadana and Vishnu in the form of Mohini, came to the village and blessed them.

== Sthala Purana ==
There is a sthala purana that describes the dispute for "Tharadevi" (the wife of Devaguru) between Chandra and Brihaspathi which made Brihaspathi much worried and disturbed his mind. He travelled to Kshetradana and finally came to Perunchery where he found peace. He worshipped Ambal in his manas and as a result Ambal entered his mind (Swa+anthara+nayagi). So he called on her name and finally Siva blessed him and his sorrow departed.

Later Chandra, Thara and Saraswati all worshipped here. A demonic king from Ceylon (Yavanan) once fought with the Chola King Dhatta. The Chola king was unable to withstand Yavana and he worshipped Swantharanayagi. She sent Kali who killed Yavana and King Dhatta was thus saved. On another occasion, the teeth of Surya had been broken by Veerabadra Swami during daksha yagna. Surya did penance here and his teeth were restored. Many such gods who suffered at the hands of Veerabadhra during Daksha yagna had their problems solved in this sthala.

=== Pariharasthala ===
This is a parihara sthala for "Guru dhosha". Also, since the swami provided mental relief for Brihaspathi himself, this is also a sthala to help rid oneself of worries.

=== Vishesha ===
Both swami and ambal are considered to be swayambu. Ambal is very varaprasadhi (fulfilling desire).

== Temples ==
A Vageeswara temple is located in the village. There is also a Mariamman temple which is very attractive and full of Shantha and Karunya. This temple is under renovation. A Buddhist temple is also located in the village.
