= All Manipur Buddhist Association =

Buddhist organization in Manipur, India

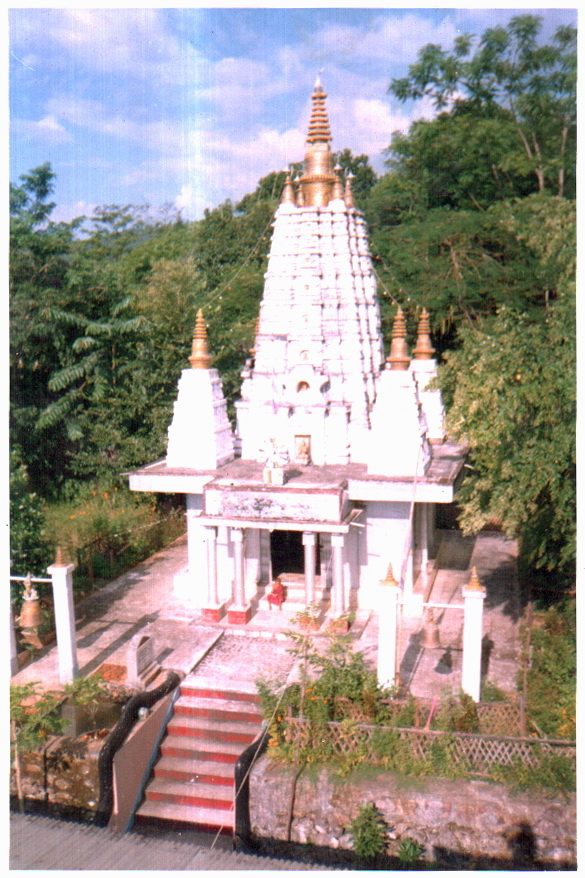
Picture was taken at Buddhist Monastery, Moreh, Manipur

All Manipur Buddhist Association (AMBA) is a Buddhist organization in Manipur, India. It was founded on the full moon day of the month of Meraa (October) in 1972 and was registered under section 20 of the Societies Registration Act XXI of 1860 in 1982. The first Vishakha Puja (Buddha Purnima) was performed in 1984 at Phayjaa Laytong in Imphal East, with Ven. Akshyananda of Tripura as the presiding monk.

For the first time in Manipur, a Buddhist monastery was established at Moreh, a town in Manipur bordering Myanmar, with the help of Ven. Akshyananda sometime in 1984–85. The present pagoda there was erected with the generous donation of Dr. Dey and his family in 1988.
