= Urgelling Monastery =

Buddhist monastery in Arunachal Pradesh, India

Coordinates: 27.5883°N 91.8653°E

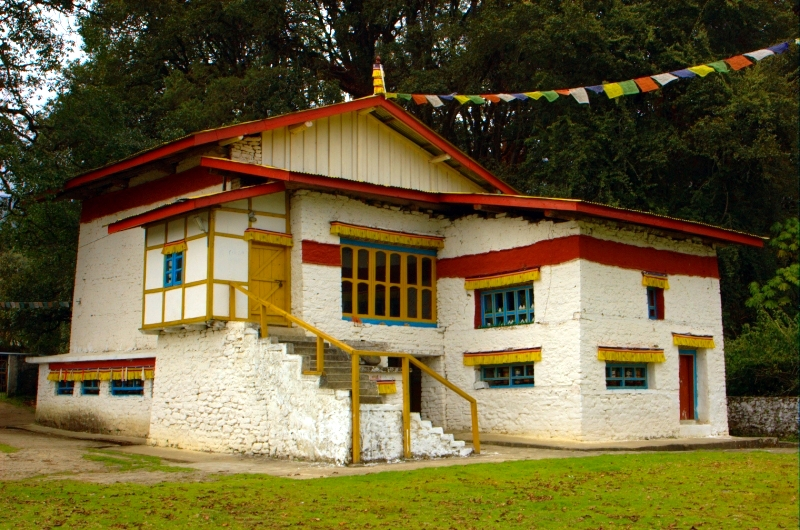
- Urgelling Monastery situated at Tawang is the birthplace of the 6th Dalai Lama

Religion
- Affiliation: Tibetan Buddhism

Location
- Location: Arunachal Pradesh, India
- Country: India
- Interactive map of Urgelling Monastery

Architecture
- Style: Tibetan
- Founder: Urgen Sangpo
- Established: 1489; 537 years ago

Urgelling Monastery is a Buddhist monastery in Arunachal Pradesh, northeastern India and is the birthplace of the 6th Dalai Lama Tsangyang Gyatso, who was born on 1 March 1683.

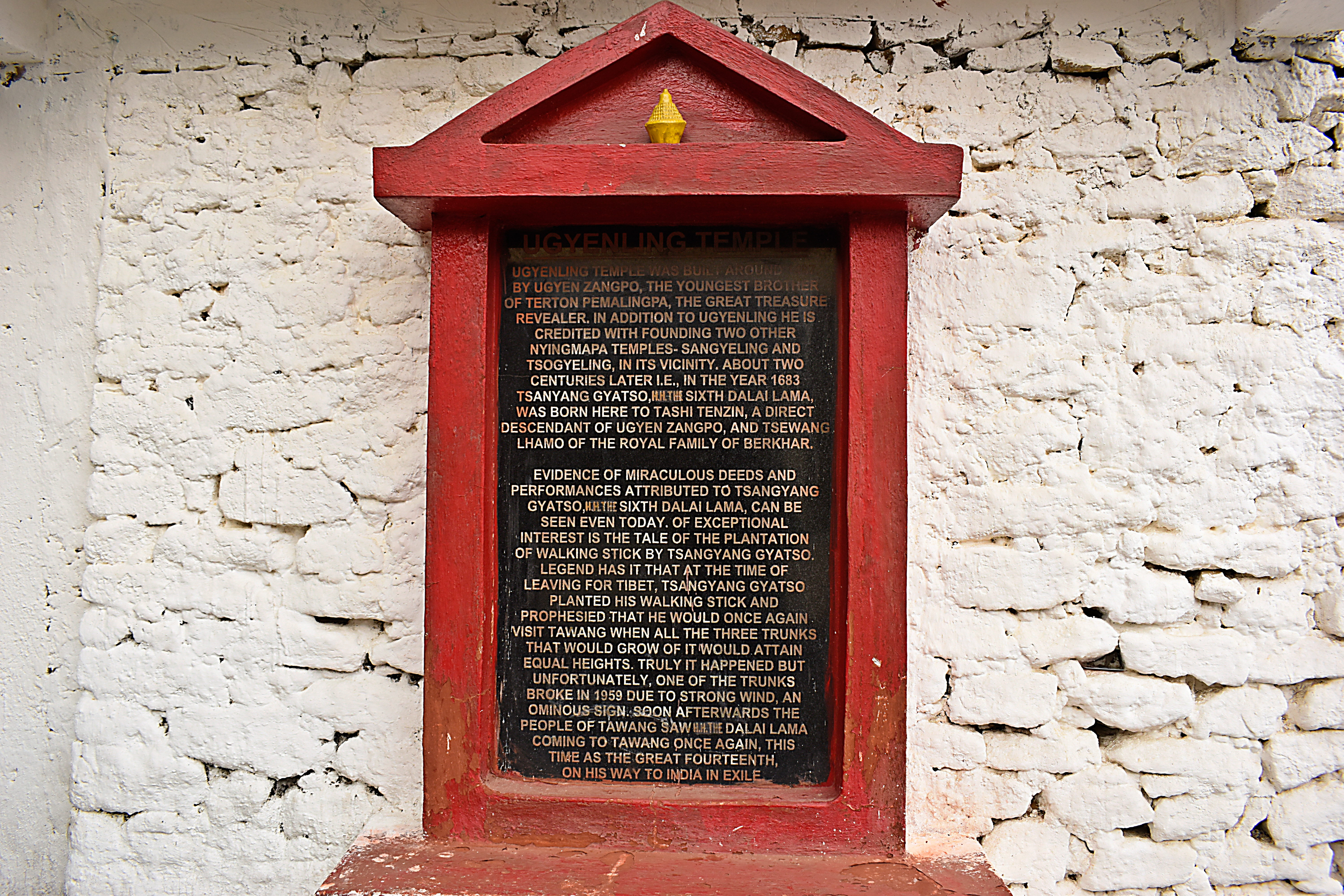
Ugyenling monastery inscription stating the birthplace of the 6th Dalai Lama

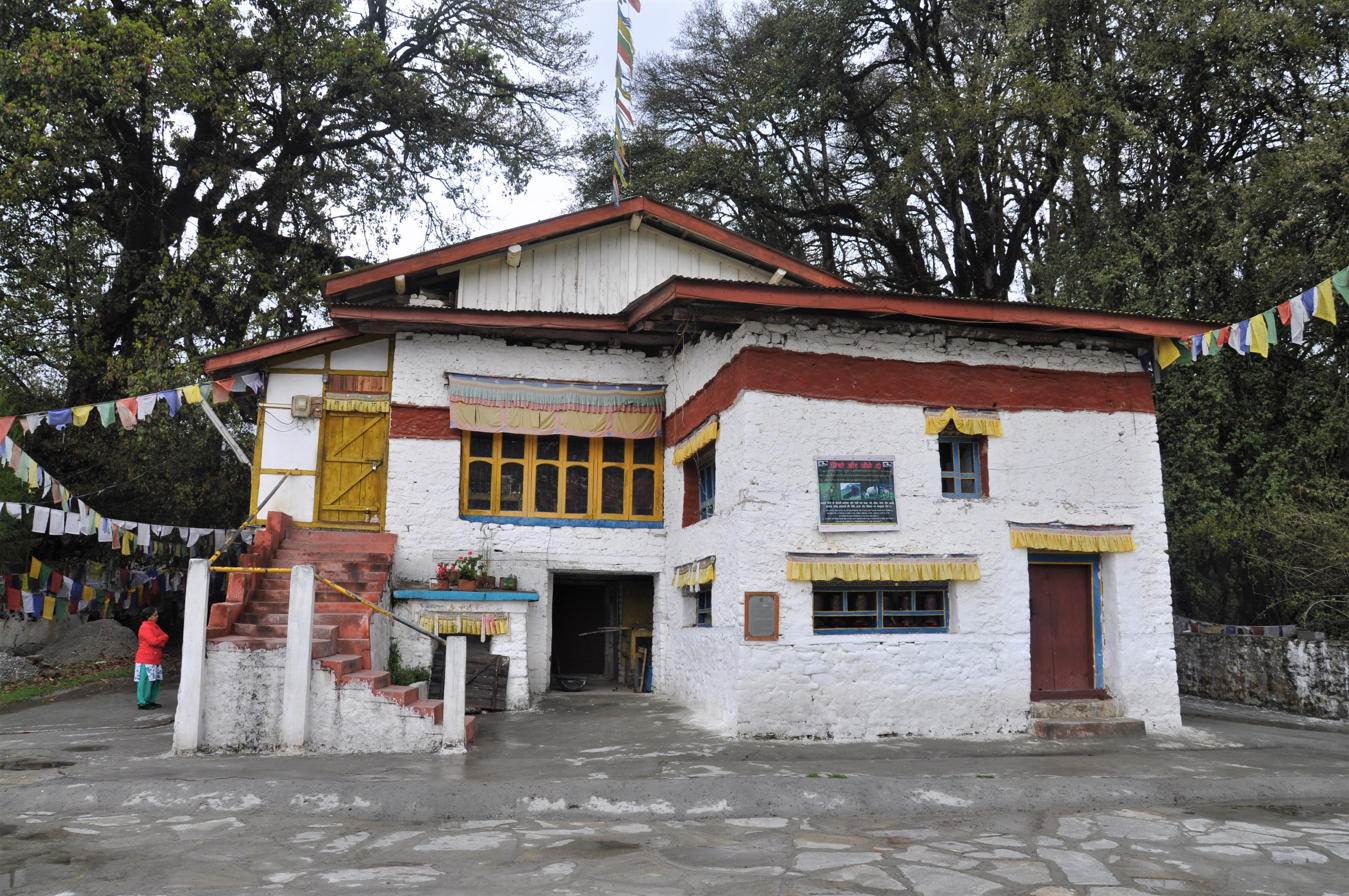
Ugyenling monastery front view
