= Tawang Taktshang Monastery =

Tibetan Buddhist sacred site and temple complex in India

Taktshang Monastery, Tawang

Religion
- Affiliation: Tibetan Buddhism

Location
- Location: Tawang, Arunachal Pradesh, India

Architecture
- Style: Dzong, 3 tiers, each dedicated to a Tibetan guru or god
- Established: 1684; 342 years ago

Taktsang Monastery is a prominent Tibetan Buddhist sacred site and temple complex, located on the cliffside of the Tawang District in the Indian state of Arunachal Pradesh (not the same as Paro Taktsang monastery).

The site is located 45 kilometres (28 mi) from Tawang township, and is believed to have been consecrated by the visit of Guru Padmasambhava in the 8th century CE. The monastery is perched on the ridge of a hillock surrounded by a dense coniferous forest and lofty mountains. The monastery has three tiers, each dedicated to a Tibetan guru or god. The monastery is a 5 km drive from the popular tourist destination Madhuri Lake (also known as Sungester Lake). Guests can visit Tirth yatra and locations nearby where Guru Padmasambhava is said to have meditated. Visitors can trek down the stairs at the back of the main complex to visit the lair of Guru Padmasambhava.

== See also ==
- Paro Taktsang (spa phro stag tshang / spa gro stag tshang), the popular name of Taktsang Palphug Monastery
