= Lingshet =

Lingshet Lingshed, Lingshot
- Village
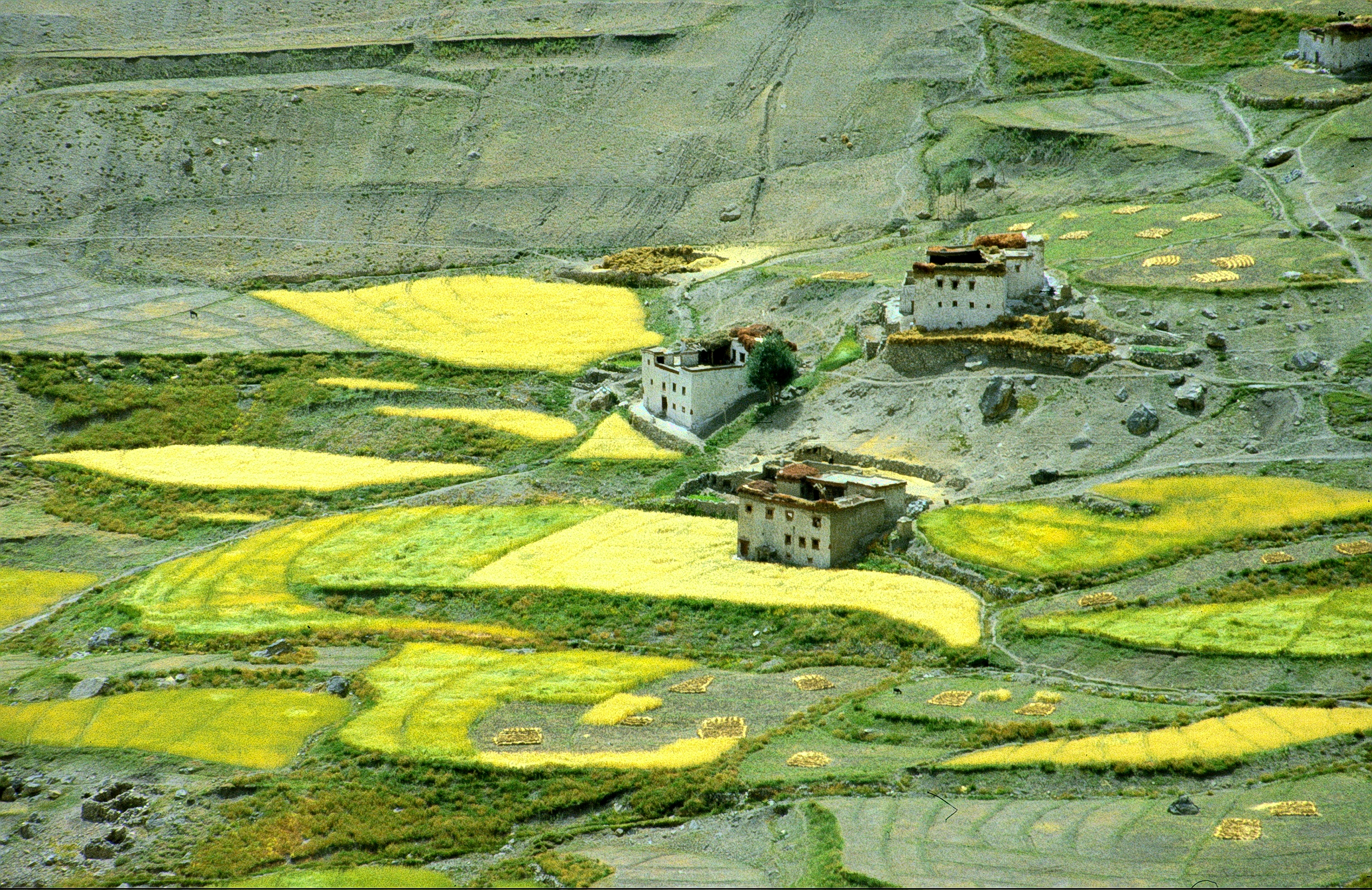
- A farm and a house

- Lingshet within Ladakh, India
- Coordinates: 33.951203°N 76.715477°E
- Country: India
- Union Territory: Ladakh
- District: Leh
- Tehsil: Leh

Population (2011)
  - Total: 913
- Time zone: UTC+5:30 (IST)
- Census code: 959

Lingshet (or Lingshed) is the headquarters of the Singelalok block in the Leh district of Ladakh, India. It is located in Leh tehsil, about a day's trek from the nearest road. The village can be accessed via a road through Singela from Lamayuru.

The Lingshed Monastery, located nearby, is about 900 years old. In 2016, solar-powered direct-current microgrids were installed at the monastery and in local school dormitories, along with a computer lab with a satellite Internet link.

== Demographics ==
According to the 2011 census of India, Lingshet has 116 households. The effective literacy rate (i.e. the literacy rate of the population excluding children aged 6 and below) is 70.26%.

Demographics (2011 Census)
	Total	Male	Female
Population	913	494	419
Children aged below 6 years	106	65	41
Scheduled caste	0	0	0
Scheduled tribe	912	493	419
Literates	567	347	220
Workers (all)	407	210	197
Main workers (total)	241	159	82
Main workers: Cultivators	169	108	61
Main workers: Agricultural labourers	0	0	0
Main workers: Household industry workers	1	1	0
Main workers: Other	71	50	21
Marginal workers (total)	166	51	115
Marginal workers: Cultivators	95	7	88
Marginal workers: Agricultural labourers	1	0	1
Marginal workers: Household industry workers	0	0	0
Marginal workers: Others	70	44	26
Non-workers	506	284	222
