= Lingshed Monastery =

Tibetan Buddhist monastery near Lingshet, Ladakh, India

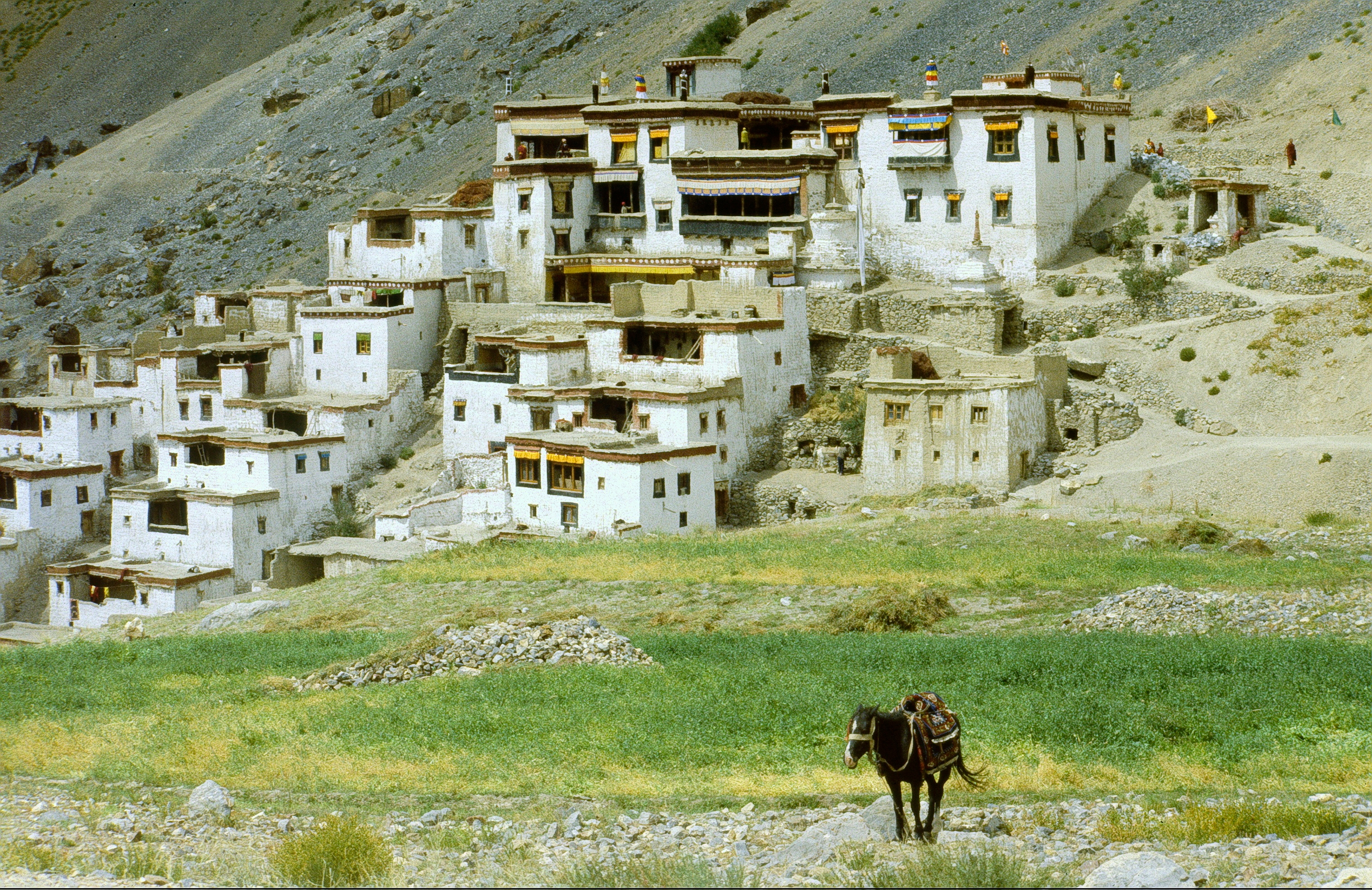
- Lingshed Monastery

- Location within India

Religion
- Affiliation: Tibetan Buddhism
- Sect: Gelug

Location
- Location: Lingshet, Leh district, Ladakh, India
- Country: India
- Interactive map of Lingshed Monastery
- Coordinates: 33°54′11″N 76°49′10″E

Architecture
- Style: Gompa
- Founder: Changsems Sherabs Zangpo
- Established: 1440; 586 years ago

Lingshed Monastery or Lingshed Gompa is a Gelugpa Buddhist monastery in Ladakh, India. It is located near Lingshet village in the Leh district. It is 84 km north of Padum. It was founded in the 1440s by Changsems Sherabs Zangpo, disciple of Je Tsongkhapa, on a monastic site previously founded by the Translator Rinchen Zangpo. The monastery has belonged to the religious estate of Ngari Rinpoche since 1779. The Jangchub Tensung Dorje Center was founded in Lingshed by Kyabje Dagom Rinpoche in 1994.

The ceremonial life of Lingshed Monastery and its monks is the subject of Identity, Ritual and State in Tibetan Buddhism (Routledge 2003) by the anthropologist Martin A. Mills.

== History ==
Lingshed Village, at the heart of the Trans-Sengge-La region between Ladakh and Zanskar, has been inhabited for nearly a thousand years. It was originally reputed to be a local hunting area, which is the source of its name. The village has been the site of several Buddhist monasteries: the remnants of a cave monastery and two walls dedicated to the translator Rinchen Zangpo (958–1055). Local tradition in the region also speaks of Kadampa and Drugpa Kagyu monasteries in the valley.

Lingshed Monastery (or Kumbum, meaning 'A Hundred Thousand Images') was founded as a Geluk School Monastery in the 1440s by Changsems Sherabs Zangpo, disciple of the noted Tibetan preceptor Je Tsongkhapa. Local tradition records how Sherabs Zangpo, having founded Karsha and Phugtal Monasteries to the south, travelled over Hanuma-La Pass to the south of Lingshed, from where he saw an 'auspicious shining light' shining on a rock on the hillside. He built a chorten around that rock, and this became the basis of Kumbum's central shrine, Tashi 'Od Bar ('Auspicious Shining Light' shrine).

In 1779, the Ladakhi king Tsewang Namgyal donated the lands of Lingshed and its surrounding villages (along with the Zanskari monasteries and villages of Karsha, Mune, Phuktal and Rangdum) to Lobsang Gelek Yeshe Dragpa, the 3rd incarnate of the Ngari Rinpoche lineage. In 1783, Ngari Rinpoche founded Rangdum Monastery on the boundary of the Karsha Valley as his ecclesiastical seat, to which Lingshed is subordinate. Lingshed Monastery was electrified by Global Himalayan Expedition in August 2016 through setting up of solar microgrids.

== Description ==
The monastery houses about 60 monks and is on the route between Zanskar and Lamayuru. It serves the surrounding villages of Lingshed, Skyumpata, Yulchung, Nyeraks, Dibling and Gongma. The monastery consists of six principal shrines, kitchens, store rooms and - on its uppermost floor - an apartment for Ngari Rinpoche or other visiting high lamas. Below the central temple complex, monastic quarters (shak) fan out in long lines. Lingshed monastery also maintains outlying shrines in each of the villages it serves.Lingshed Gonpa has also a Lingshed Labrang in the capital city leh, opposite to the New Bus Stand Leh.

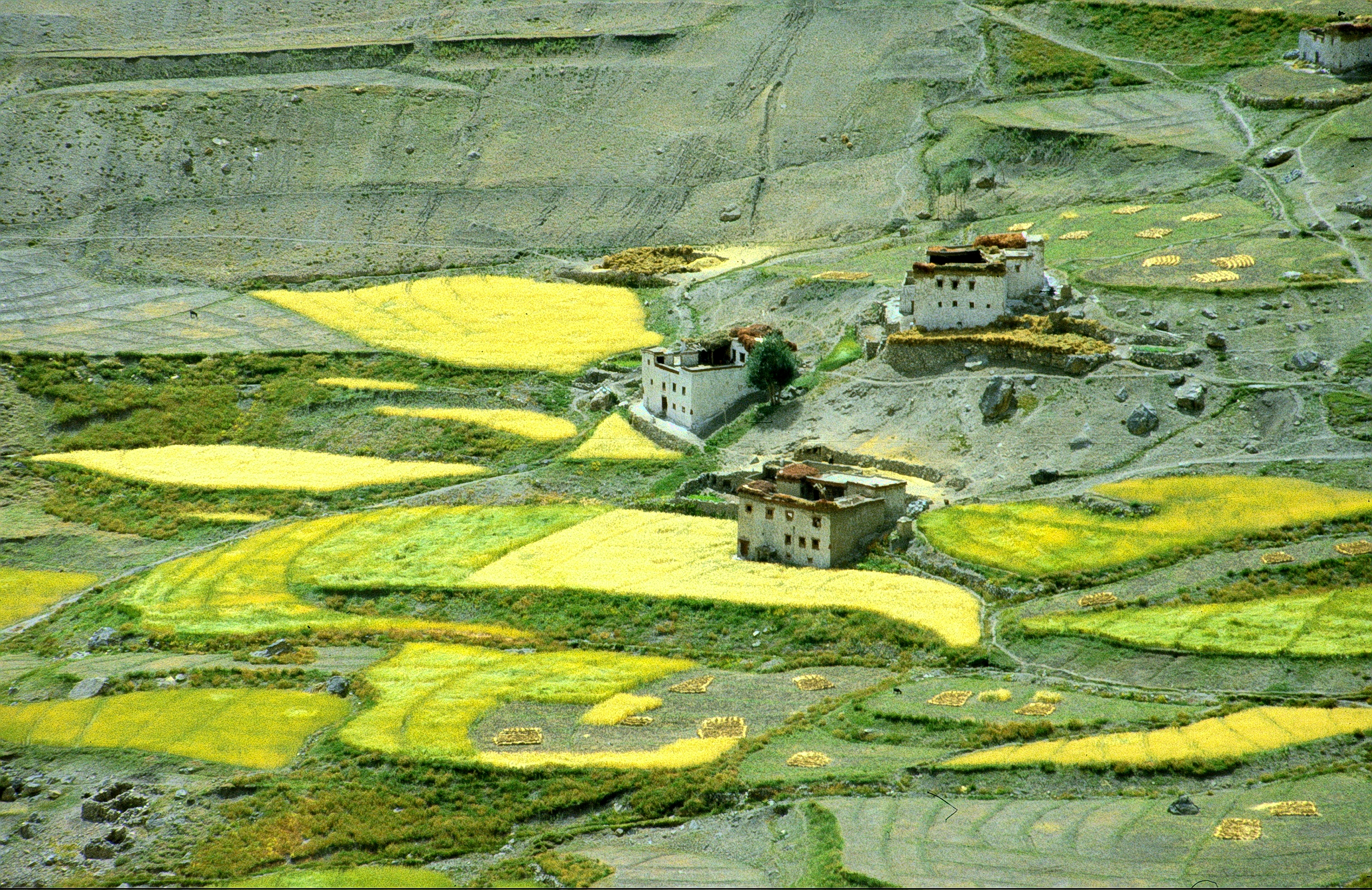

It is marked on an early survey map as 'Linshot' and is four marches south of Khalatse. There were two sons of La-chen-Bha-gan (c. 1470-1500 CE), the third king of the Second West Tibetan Dynasty. The younger son had the eyes of his elder brother, Lha-chen-Lha-dbaṅ-rnam-rgyal (c. 1500-1532), put out and then he took the throne. "Still, for the continuance of the race, he stationed him, together with his wife at Liṅ-sñed" where his wife bore three sons.

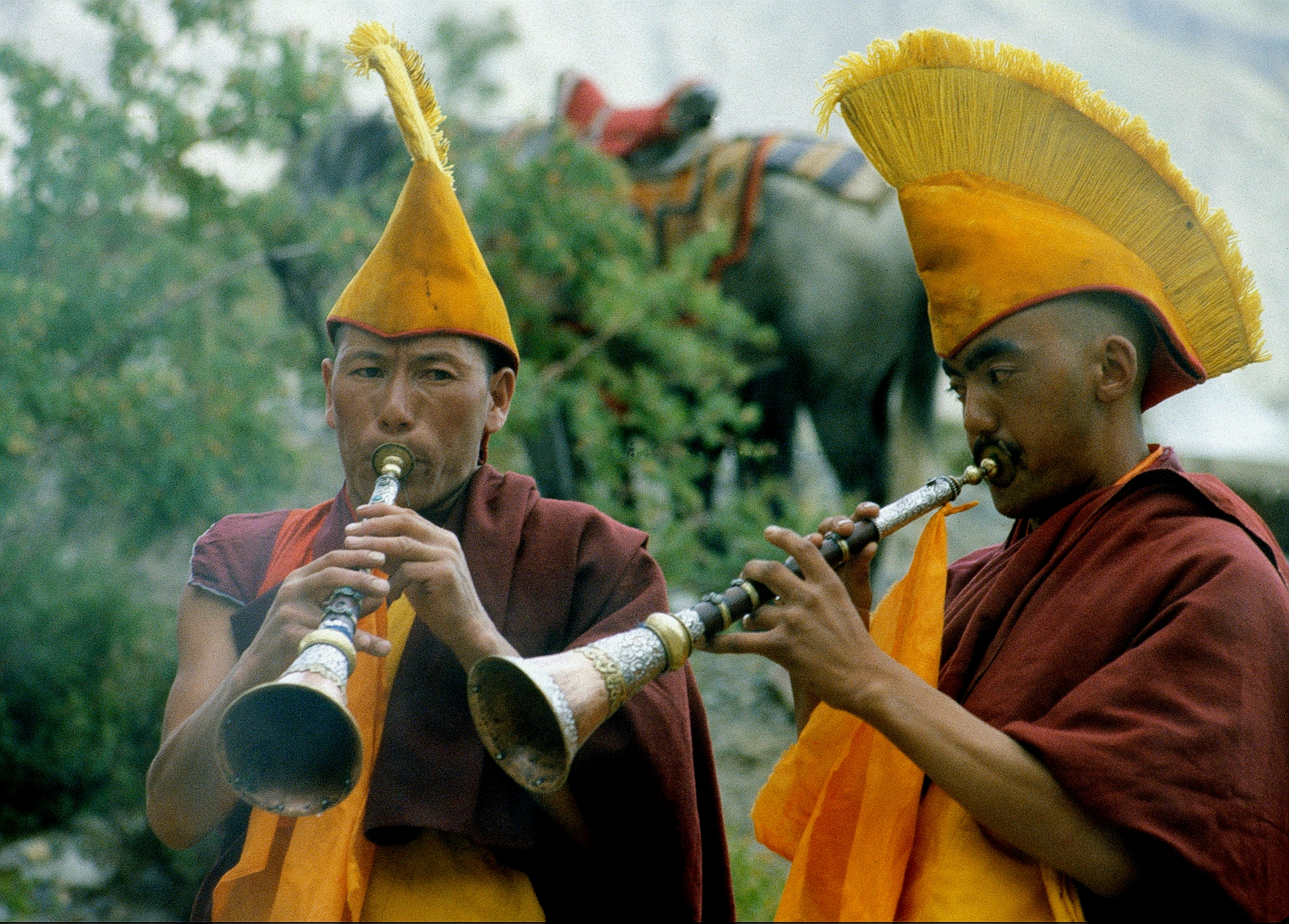

== See also ==
- List of buddhist monasteries in Ladakh
- Tourism in Ladakh
