= Rigyalling Monastery =

Buddhist monastery in Arunachal Pradesh, India

Religion
- Affiliation: Tibetan Buddhism

Location
- Location: Arunachal Pradesh, India
- Country: India

Rigyalling Monastery is a Buddhist monastery in Arunachal Pradesh, northeastern India.
