= Gemur Monastery =

Buddhist gompa in Himachal Pradesh, northern India

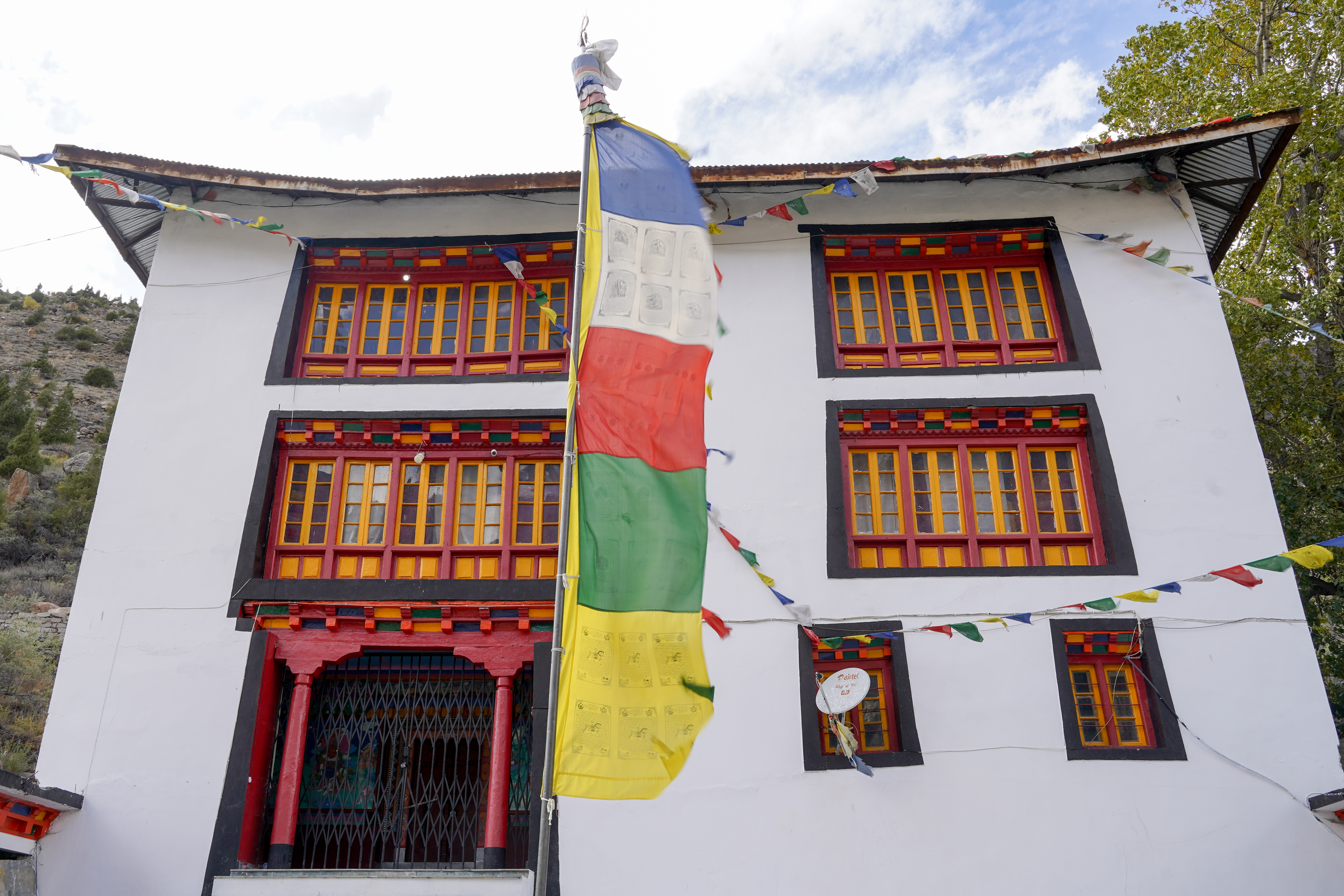
- Main building, Gemur Gompa

- Location within Himachal

Religion
- Affiliation: Tibetan Buddhism

Location
- Location: Gemur, Lahaul and Spiti district, Himachal Pradesh, India
- Country: India
- Interactive map of Gemur Monastery
- Coordinates: 32°36′55.33″N 77°8′48.80″E

Gemur Monastery is a Buddhist gompa, above the village of Gemur, Lahaul and Spiti district, Himachal Pradesh, northern India. The monastery dates from the first half of the 17th century.

== Geography ==
The Gemur Gompa, elevation 3,370 m (11,060 ft), is about 700 m (2,300 ft) on foot from Gemur village. Gemur village is located on NH-505 17 km (11 mi) upstream from Keylong in the Bhaga River valley, Lahaul. A rural road off NH-505 between Keylong and Gemur, terminates at the Gompa. This route covers a distance of 23 km (14 mi) from Keylong.

== History ==
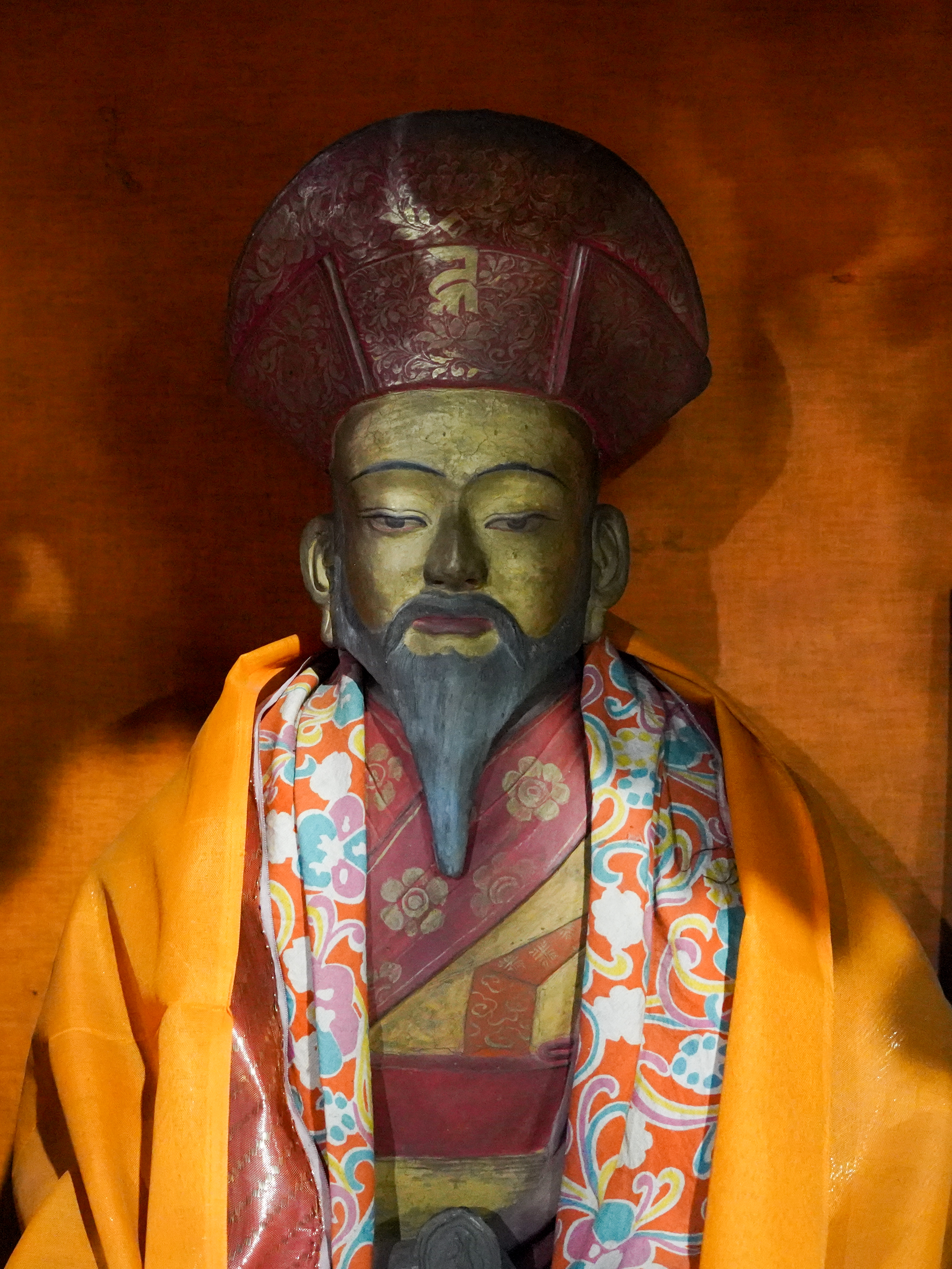
Clay statue of Lama Tansin Paldan

The Gemur Gompa (monastery) is regarded as a central seat of Tibetan Buddhism in the sTod valley of Lahaul. In religious literature it is also known as Dge-smon Gsam-bstan chos-gling. It is said to be founded by sTagtshang Raspa in the first half of the 17th century. As per the legends and folklore Lama Tanzin Paldan of Gemur village was responsible for its construction with the aid of the Thakurs of Khangsar. Scholars have argued that the Gemur gompa was located at a higher altitude and the present structure was relocated to the lower hill in 1870. The wood work of the temple is credited to Tashi Tamphel. The lamas of Gemur belong to the Drukpa Kagyu sect. Lamas were sent from this monastery to the Gompas of Dartse, Chhukutsi, Zong, Khangsar and Photang in Jispa.

It is reported that a Thanka of a Dam-can Jagpa Me-Len was stolen from the monastery along with other valuable articles in the 1960s. This is a Tibetan Buddhist painting made on silk cloth and prepared by sewing patches of silk by hand. This used to be displayed during the Tshechu festival every year held in the monastery when the cham dance was performed.

== Architecture and fittings ==
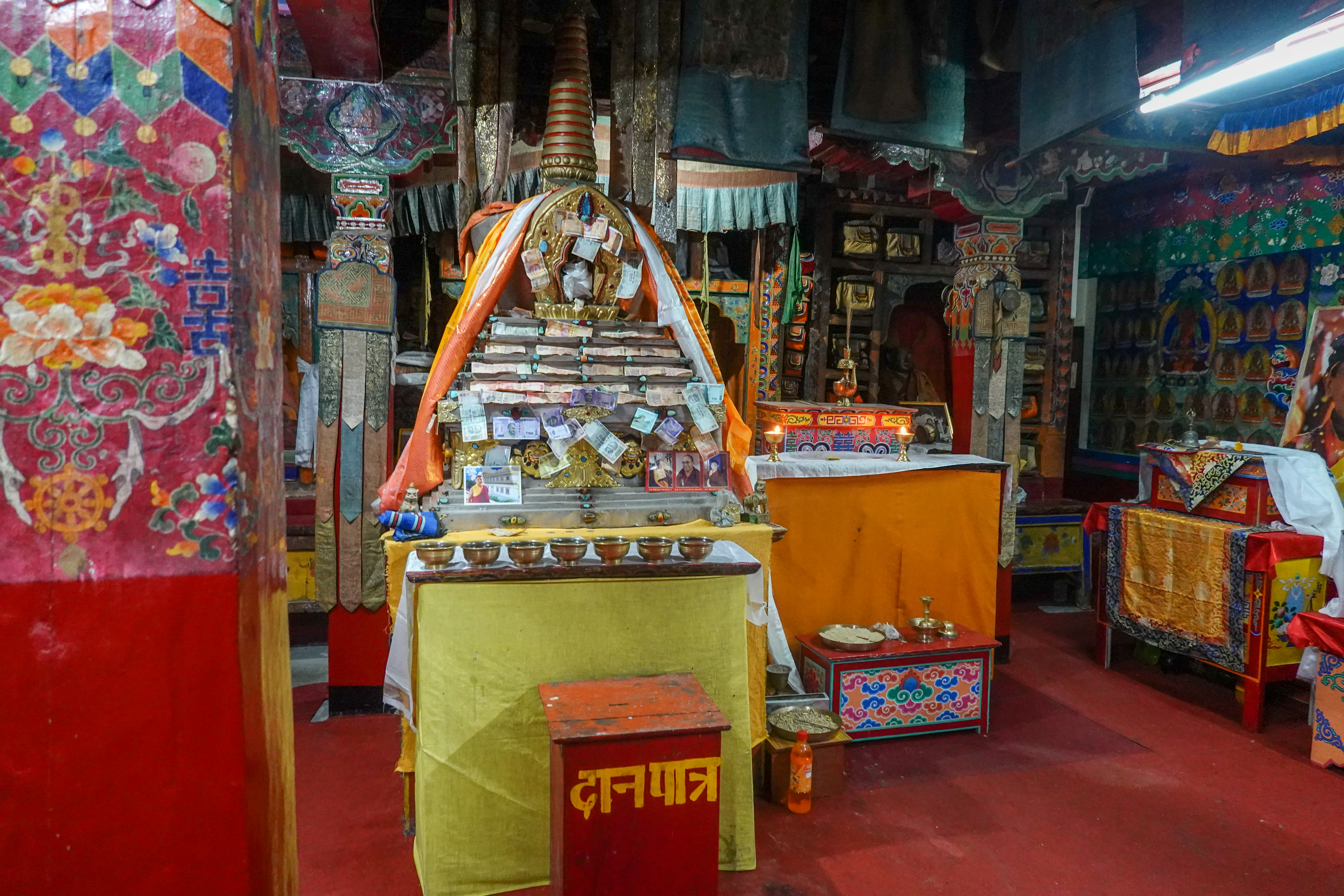
Central prayer hall

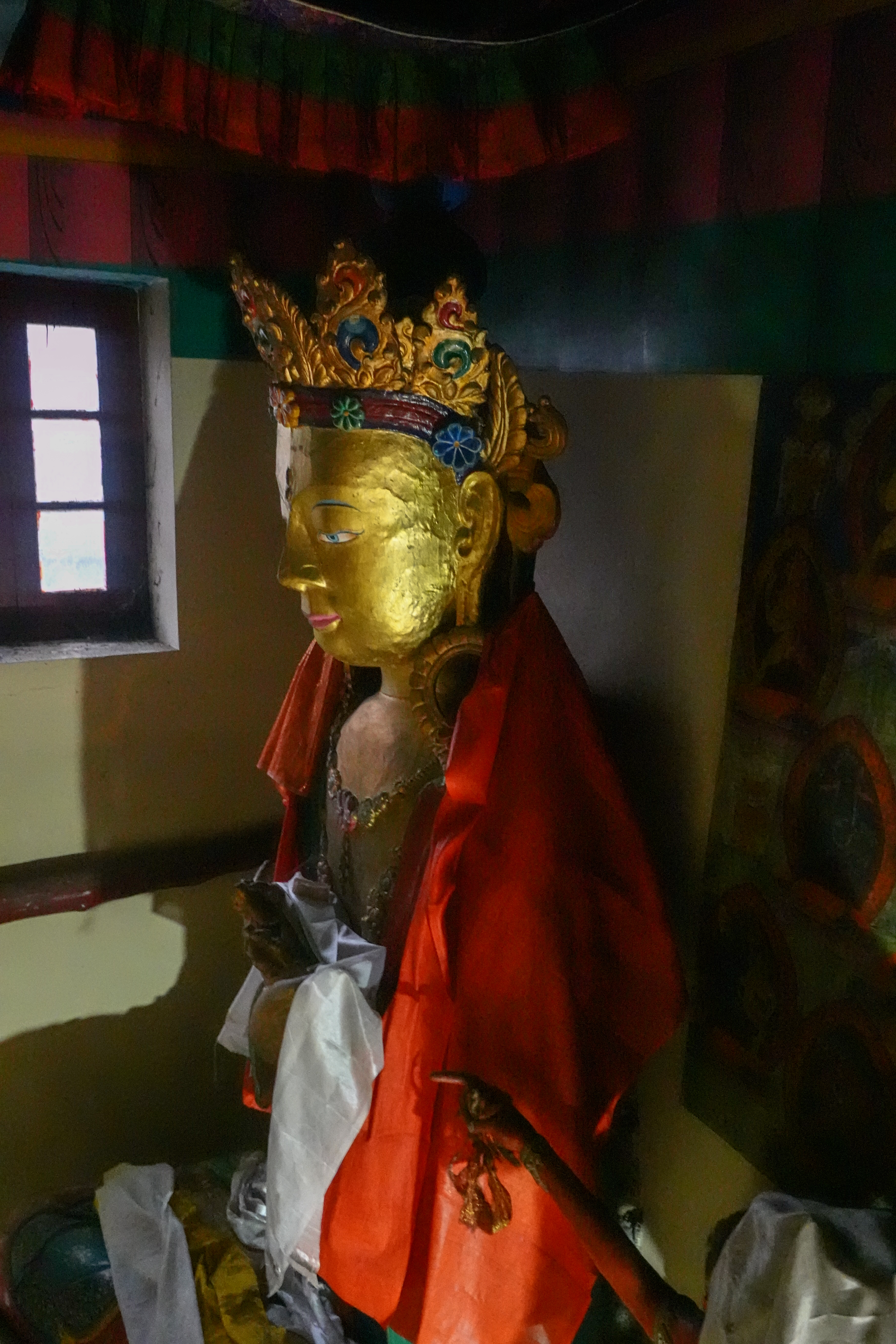
Goddess Marichi Vajravarahi, Oct '20

The Gompa contains a sculpture of the goddess 'Marichi Vajravarahi'. The monastery also contains ancient Buddhist miniature paintings, wall paintings, chortens, statues and Buddhist artifacts.

== Features ==
The Tshechu Fair is a religious festival celebrated all over the Buddhist Himalayas. This fair is celebrated on different dates at different places. At the Shashur, Gemur, Kyi, Kardang, Tabo and Mane Monasteries it is held in the month of June. The cham, a lively masked and costumed dance, is performed during this festival.

== Gallery ==
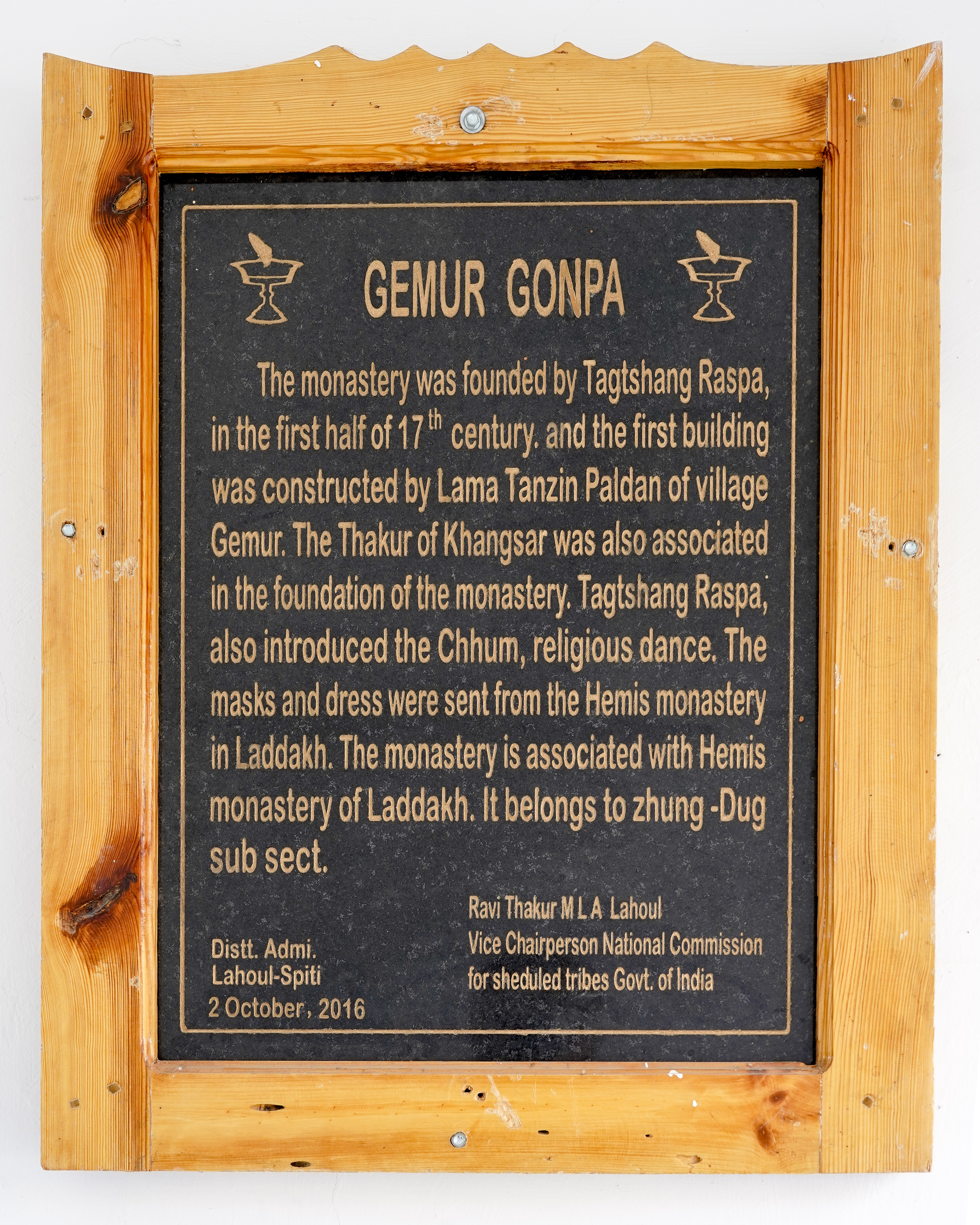
Info board, Oct '22

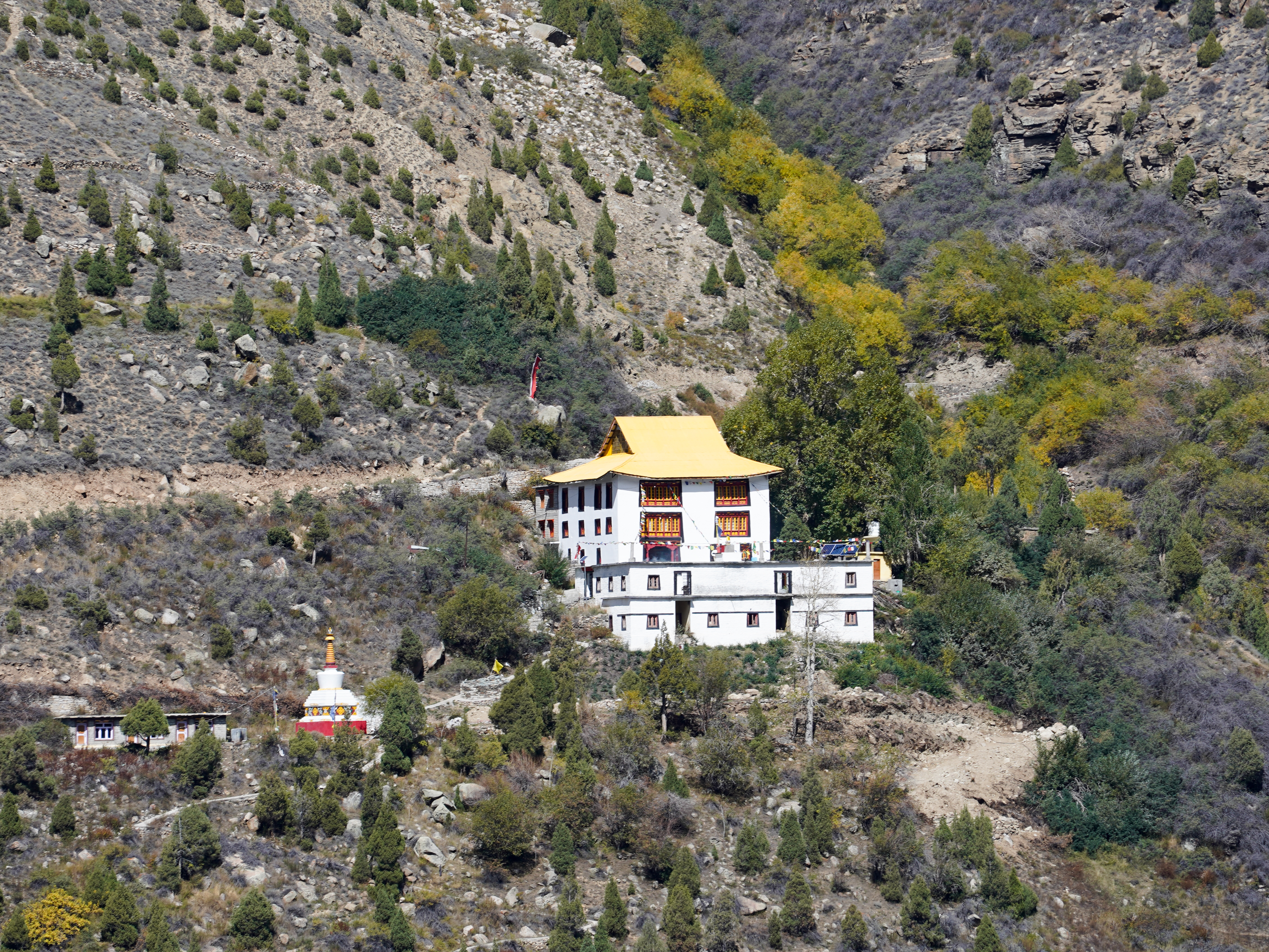
Distant view, Oct '22

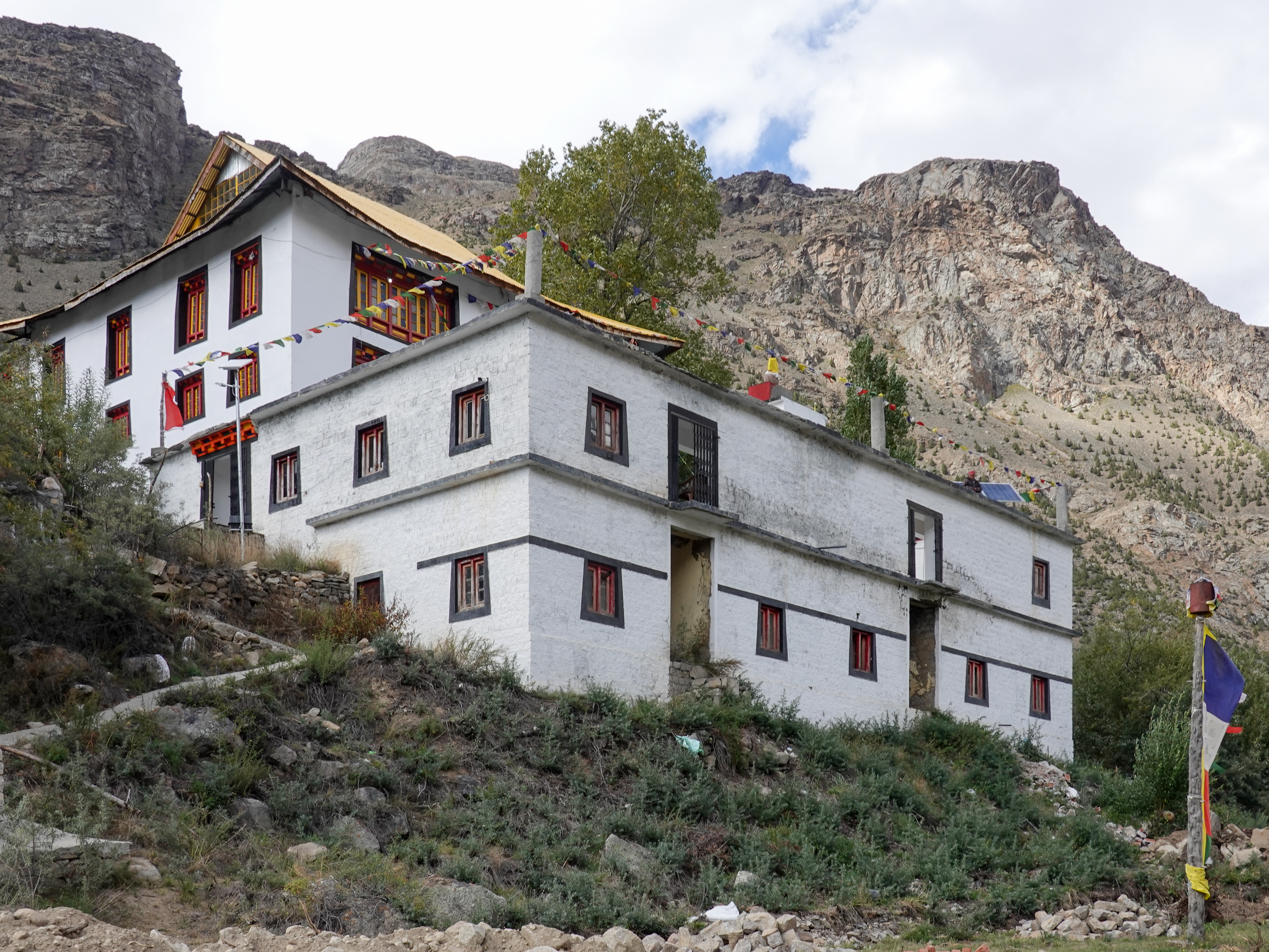
Gemur Gompa exterior, Oct '22

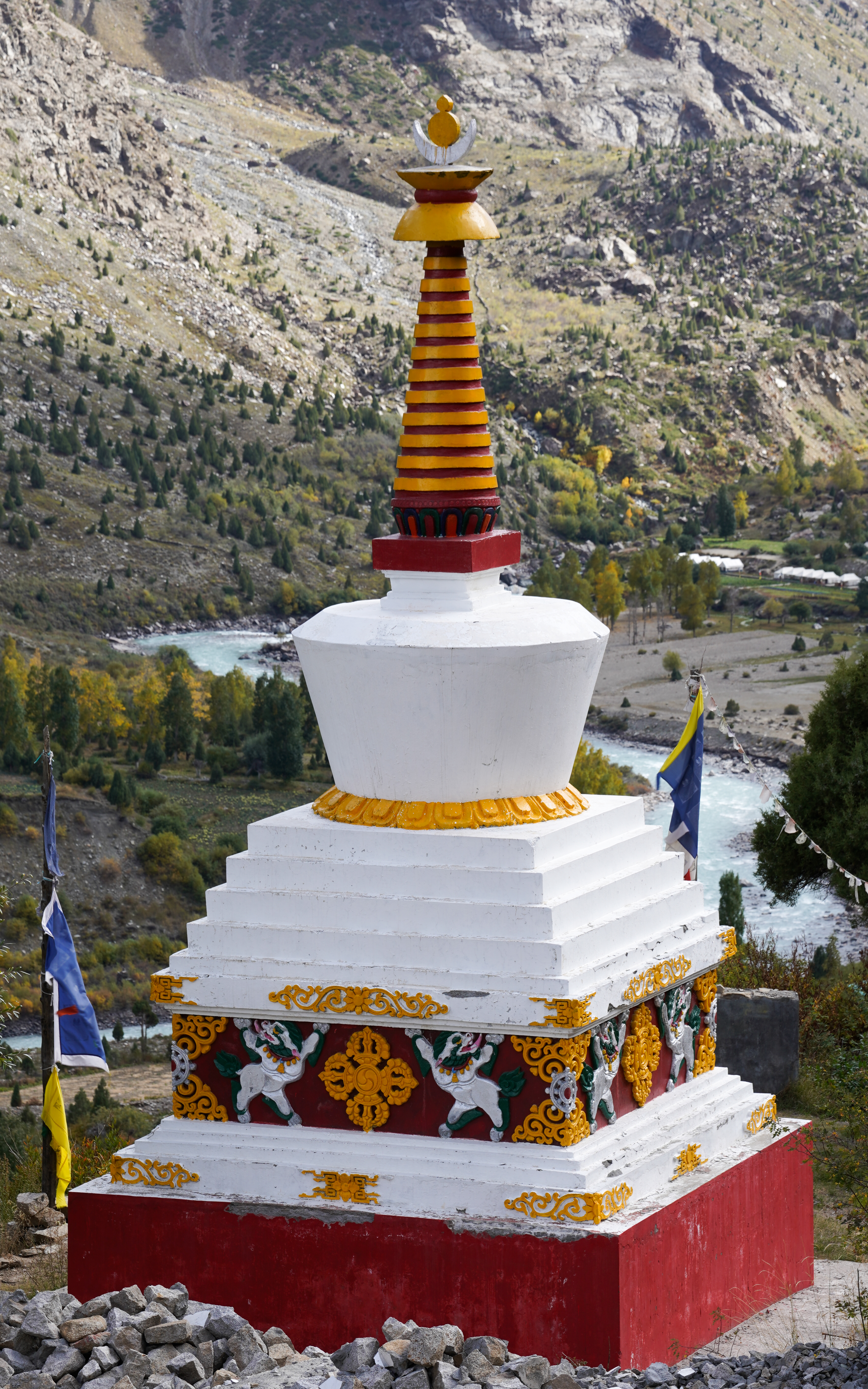
Chorten, Oct '22

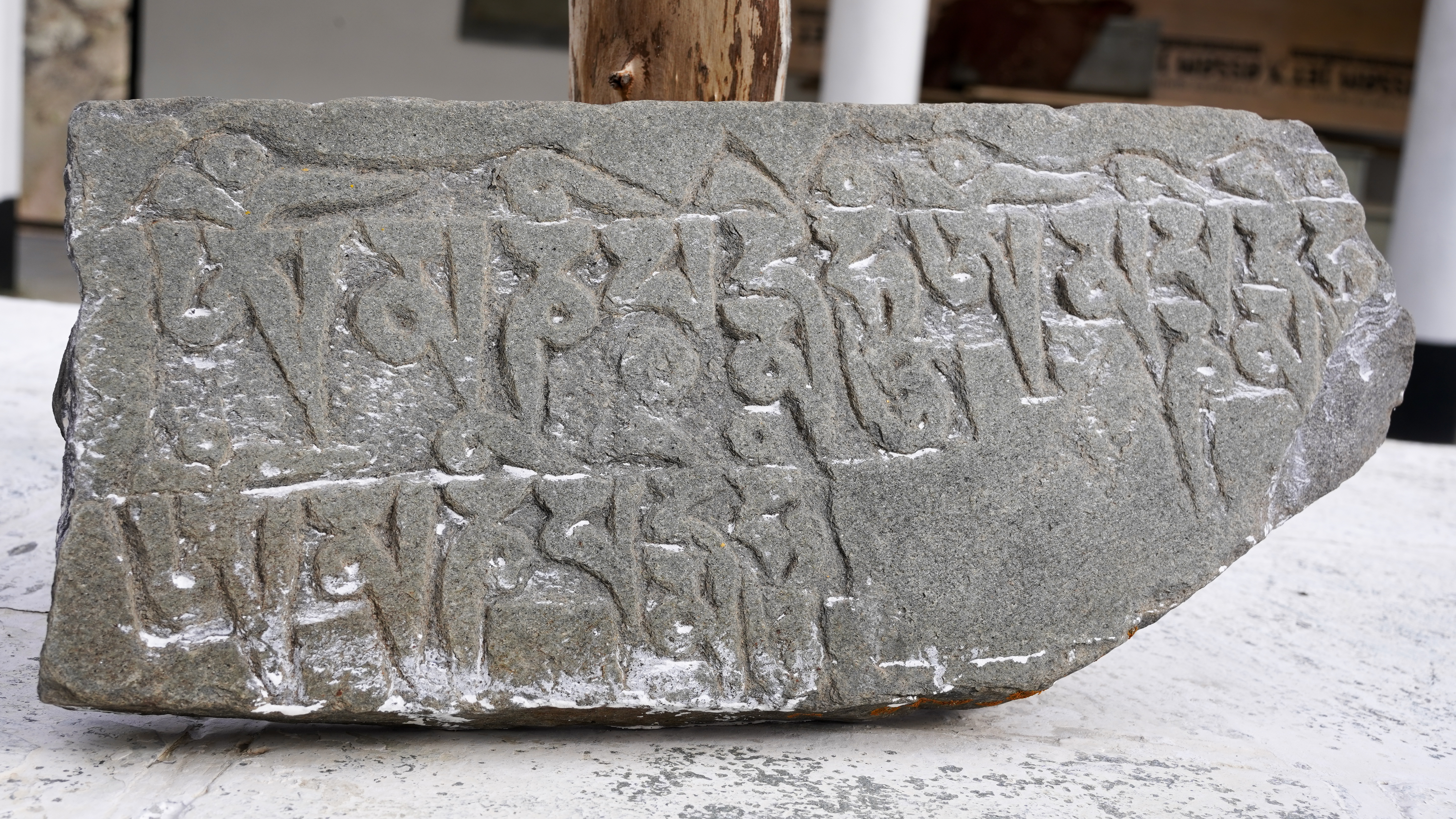
Stone inscription

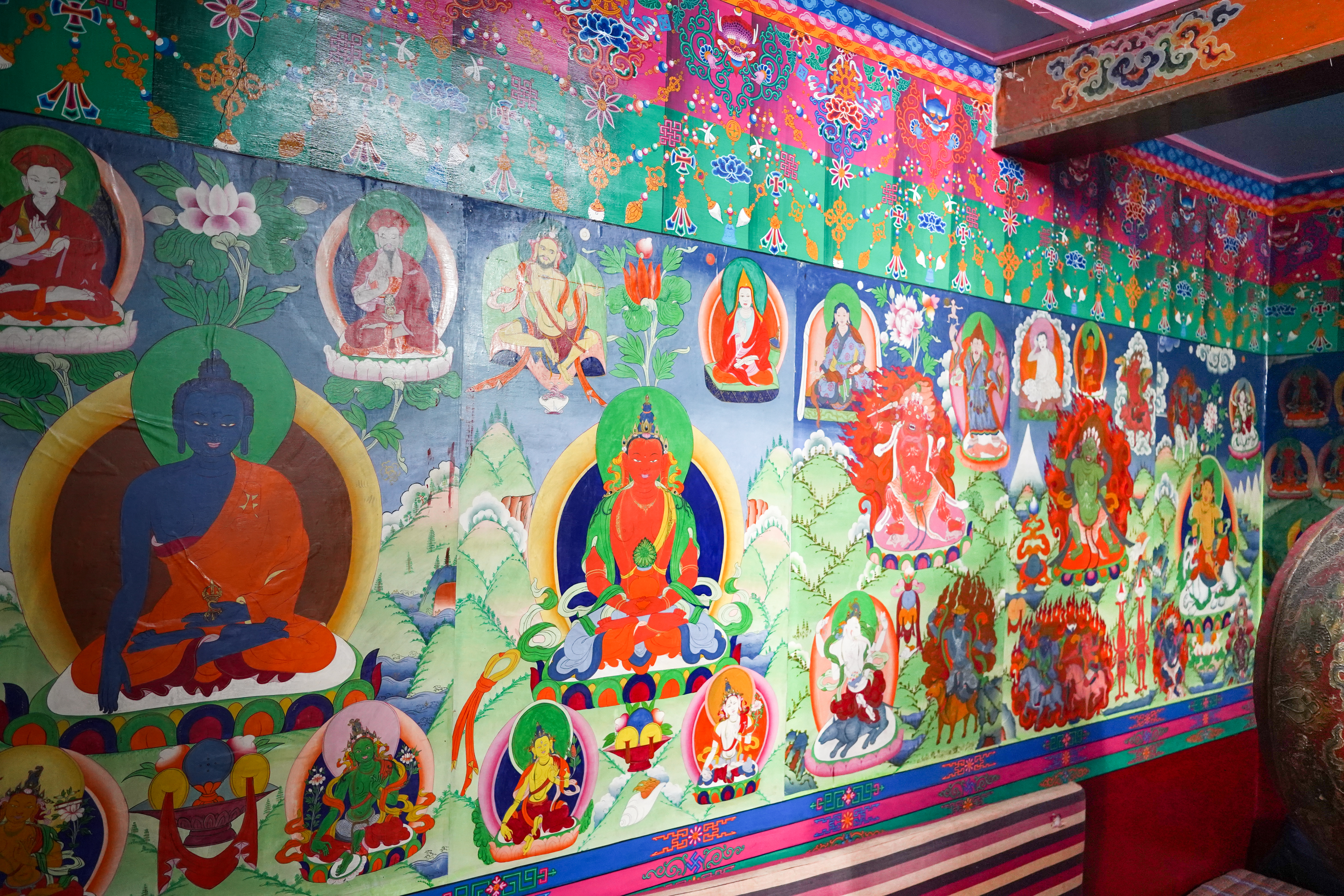
Mural inside entrance
