= Matho Monastery =

Tibetan Buddhist monastery in Ladakh, northern India

Coordinates: 33°59′56″N 77°37′51″E

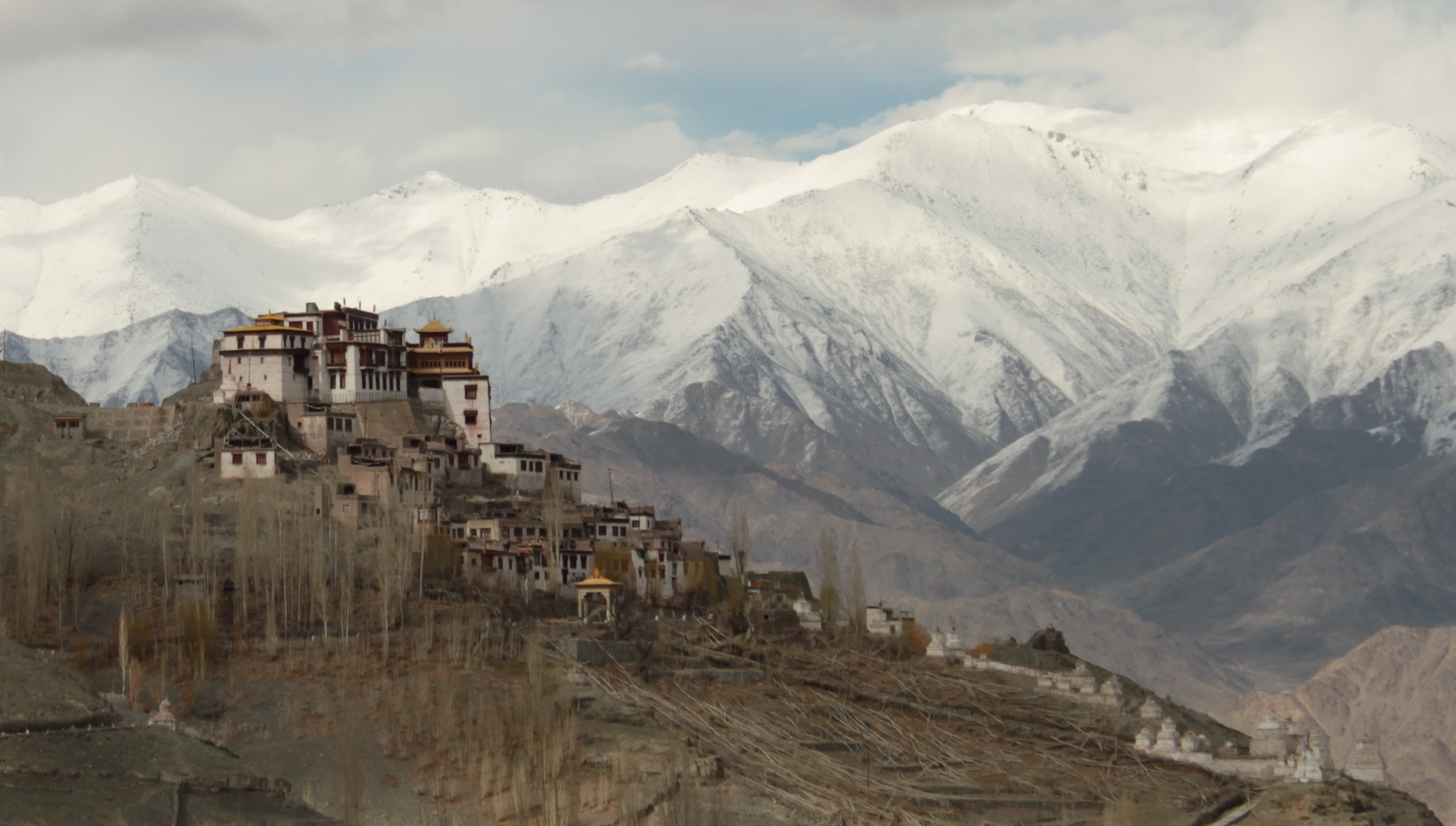
Matho Gonpa near Leh in Ladakh, the only representative of the Sakyapa sect of Tibetan Buddhism in Ladakh.

Matho Monastery, or Matho Gonpa or Mangtro Monastery or Mangtro Gonpa, from the Tibetan "mang" that means "many" and "tro" that means "happiness", is a Tibetan Buddhist monastery located 26 kilometres southeast of Leh in Ladakh, northern India, on the banks of the Indus River. The village of Matho is located at the mouth of a deep gorge running out of the Zanskar Range and across the Indus. It is directly opposite Thikse Monastery.

Matho and Skidmang in the eastern Ladakh (130 km to the east of Leh) are the only example in Ladakh of the Sakyapa sect of Tibetan Buddhism. Because Matho does not lie on the main highway from Leh, it sees fewer visitors than Hemis, Thiske or Shey. However, Matho Monastry is known to outsiders for its annual Oracle Matho Nagrang Festival, held on the 14th and 15th days of the first month of the Tibetan calendar. During this festival, two oracles, known as "Rongtsan", are said to inhabit for a few hours the body of two monks. The purpose of these oracles is to attempt to predict the fortunes of the local village communities for the coming year. Two monk that are to be the oracles vehicles are chosen every three years by the monks of the monastery for a duration of 3 years. The first year the monks will have to meditate for 9 months before the festival. The following two years the meditation will last 2 months. When the two monk come out from the retreat, all the monks will gather together to form a circle. The names of the two monks will be placed in a bowl. The bowl is then sealed and passed from one monk to the next until one name comes out from the bowl - this monk is chosen by the monastery's protector to perform the oracle.

Matho is also home to a collection of thangkas dating back to the 14th century.

== History ==
Founded in 1410 by Lama Dugpa Dorje, it belongs to the Sakya Order. It is noted for its six-hundred-year-old thangkas and its Matho Nagrang Festival.

The gompa is the only one in Ladakh belonging to the Sakyapa and is said to be one of the few which is seeing an increase of monks in recent years.

== Description ==
Most of the buildings are rather dilapidated but there is a new assembly hall or du-khang which was built in 2005 and which has very colourful paintings and a Sakyamuni Buddha as main statue. There is a small chapel on the top story containing images of Sakya Pandita and other Sakya lamas. There is a 'museum' adjoining it with a number of very beautiful old thangkas, some of which are thought to have been brought from Tibet in the first half of the 15th century when the monastery was founded. Unfortunately, many of them are very worn. The masks and robes worn by the lamas in the annual dance festival may also be seen in the museum.

== The festival of the oracles ==
The annual festival of the two Rongtsan oracles takes place around the Buddhist new year, usually in the first half of March. Two monk are chosen every three years to get ready as the potential receptacles. They purify themselves with months of fasting and meditation to make themselves suitable receptacles for receiving the oracles spirits. When possessed they are said to be able to perform many astounding feats such as cutting themselves with knives and walking around the ramparts of the top storey blindfolded with no fear of falling down the precipice below. While in this trance state they answer questions about the prospects for Matho and Ladakh for the coming year as well as personal questions put to them by individuals. However, if skeptical questions are put to the oracle to test him, he is said to react "with a frenzied display of anger."

== See also ==
- List of buddhist monasteries in Ladakh
- Tourism in Ladakh
