= Kulu Vase =

Ancient Buddhist goblet

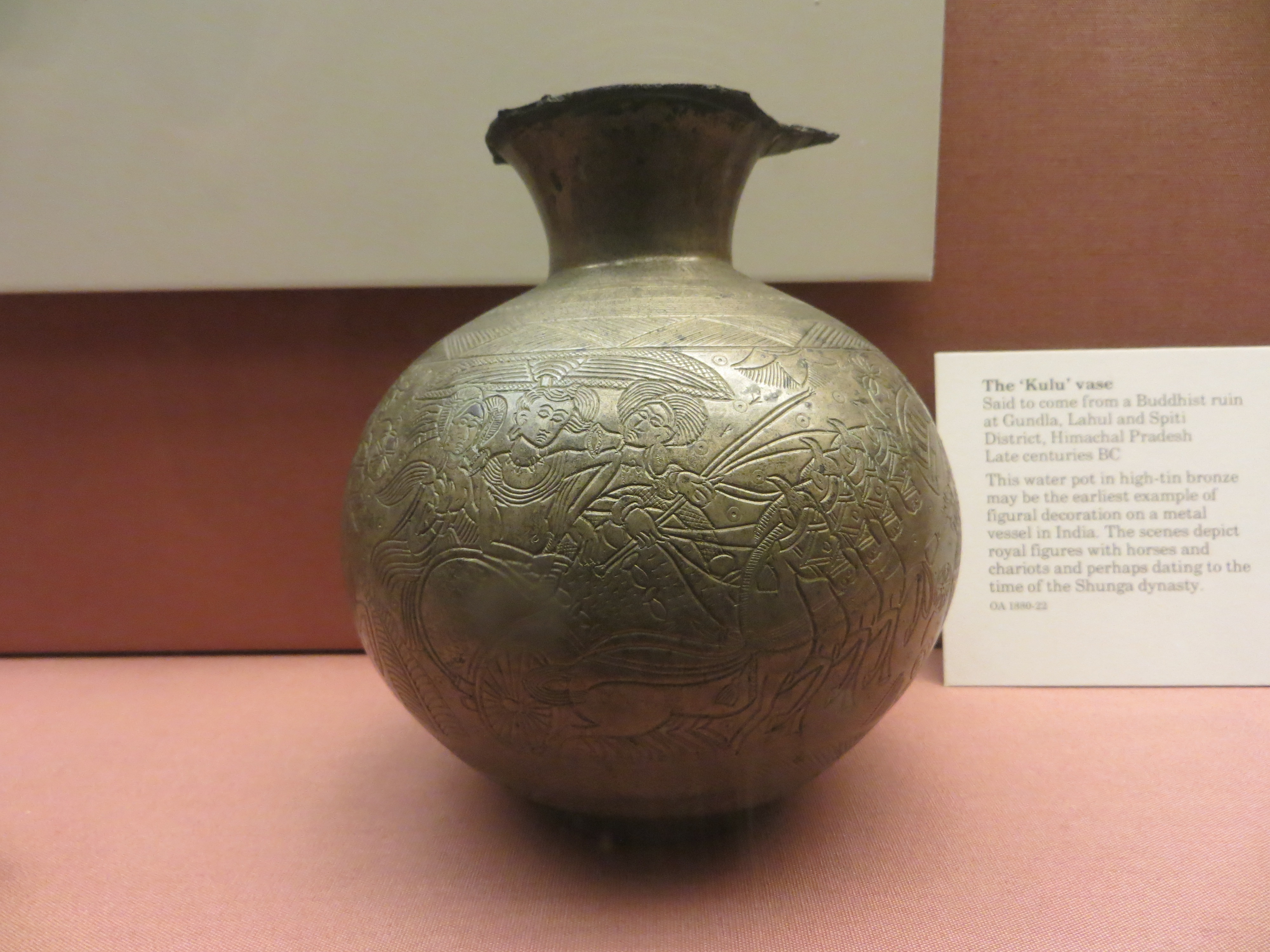
- Kulu Vase as displayed in the British Museum
- Material: Bronze
- Size: Height 15 cm
- Created: 1st century BC
- Present location: British Museum, London
- Registration: 1880.22

The Kulu Vase is the name of an ancient Buddhist bronze goblet found in the foothills of the Himalayas during the mid-19th century. The importance of the vase lies in the fact that it is one of the oldest metal objects to be decorated in this fashion on the Indian subcontinent. Since 1880, the vase has been part of the British Museum's Asian collection.

== Discovery ==
Although originally thought to come from Kulu, the vase was discovered in 1857 near the Gandhola Monastery, about 18 km from Keylong in Lahaul, Himachal Pradesh. A landslip had exposed an ancient Buddhist cell which had been lying dormant for over 1,500 years. The vase was eventually acquired by Major Hay, the local political agent of the British Raj, who donated it to the India Museum in London. In 1880 the vase, like many other items in the India Museum, was transferred to the British Museum.

== Description ==
The Kulu Vase is spherical in shape with a high neck and wide rim which is partly damaged. The frieze on the vase illustrates a courtly figure or monarch who heads a chariot procession. Bestriding a chariot pulled by four horses, he is closely followed by a line of cavalry and another royal personage riding an elephant. At the end of the procession two female musicians are playing a flute and harp. The neck of the vase is decorated with a range of different patterns including chevrons and parallel lines. Without any inscriptions or local context to the find, it is difficult to determine the significance and meaning of the characters and ceremony portrayed on the vase.

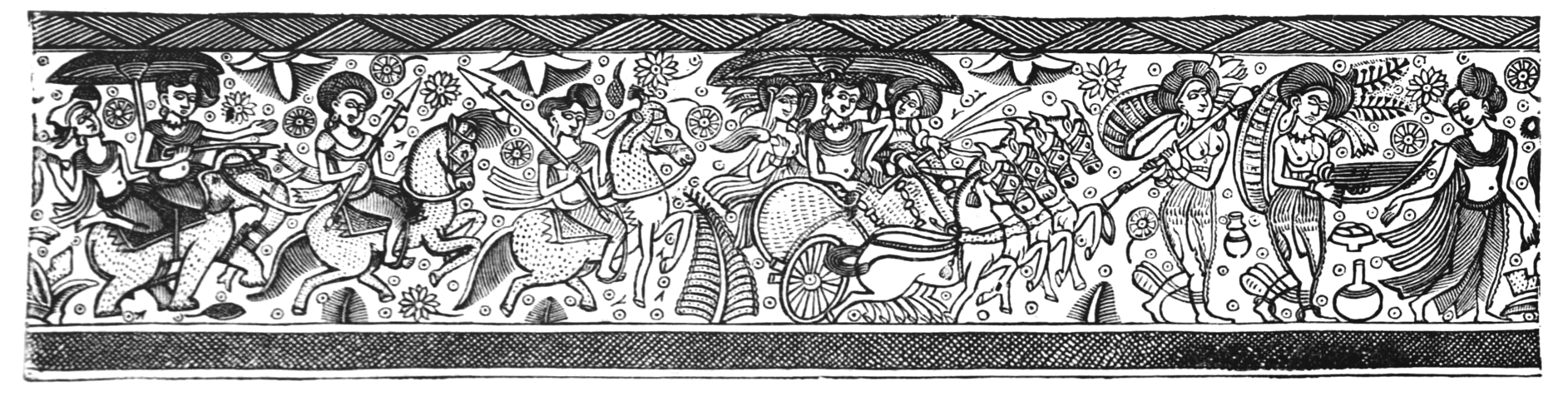
Kulu vase drawing detail.

== Gallery ==
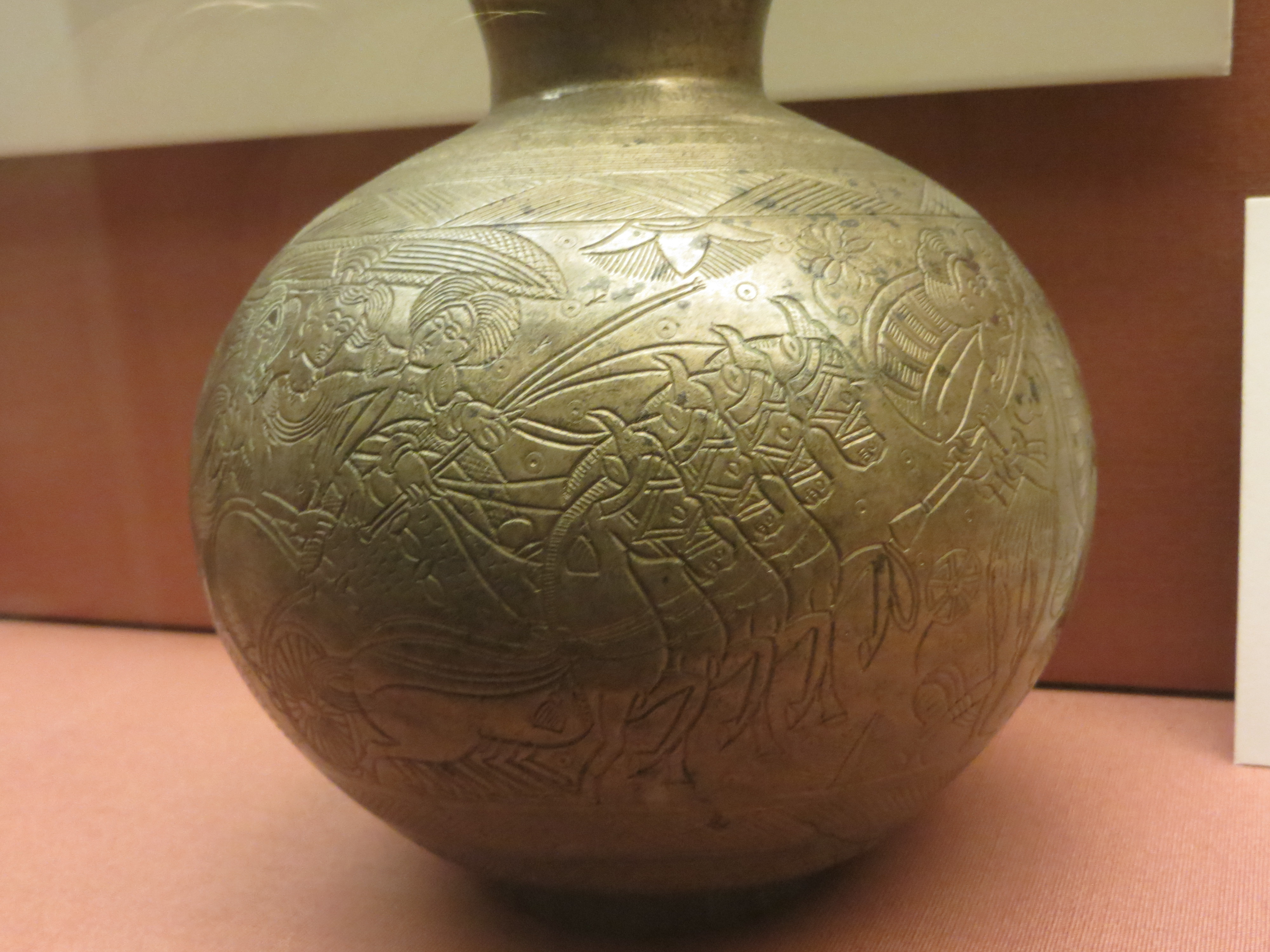
Detail of the Kulu Vase showing the chariot drawn by four horses

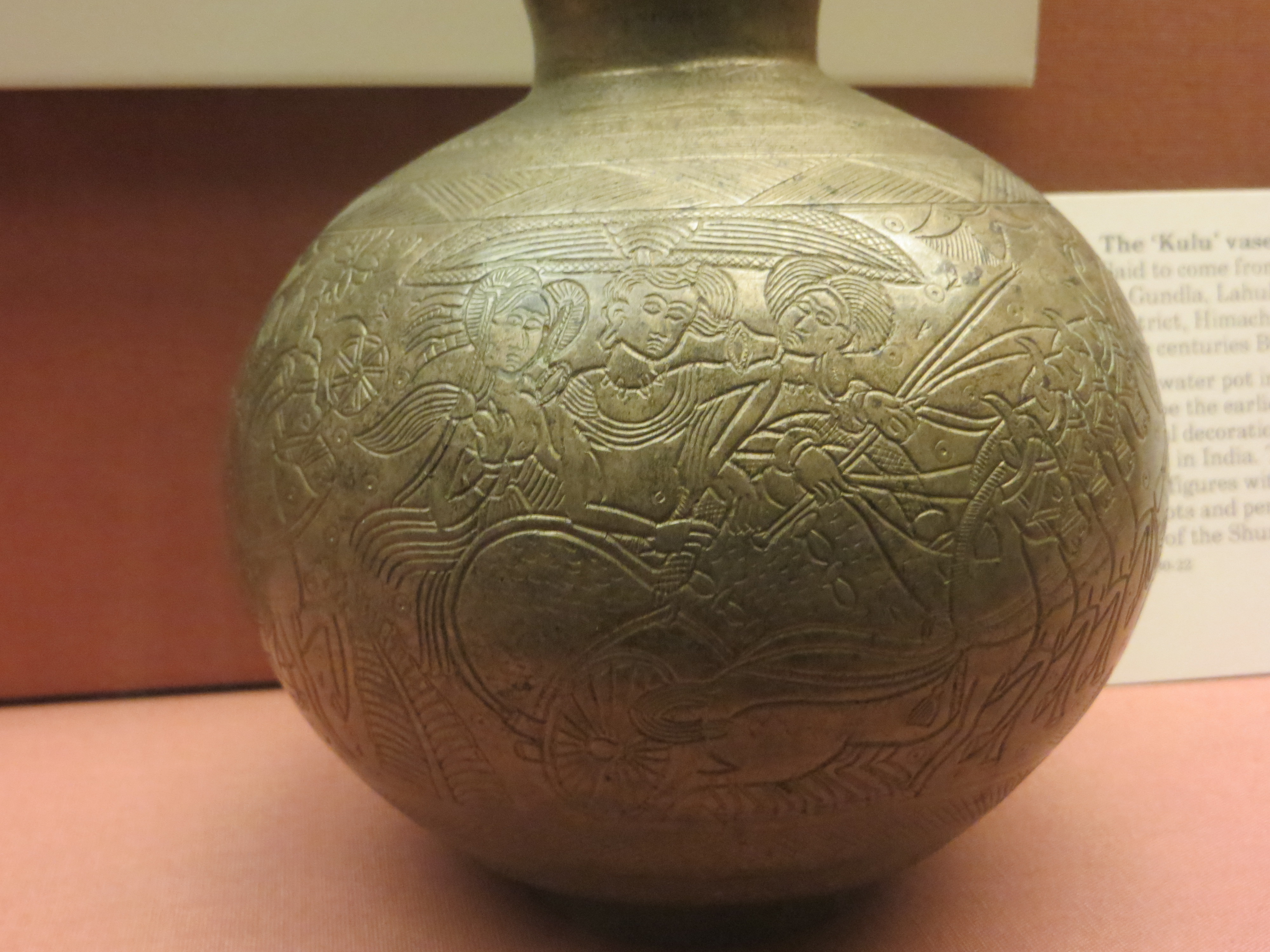
Detail of the Kulu Vase showing the royal dignitary flanked by two female attendants
