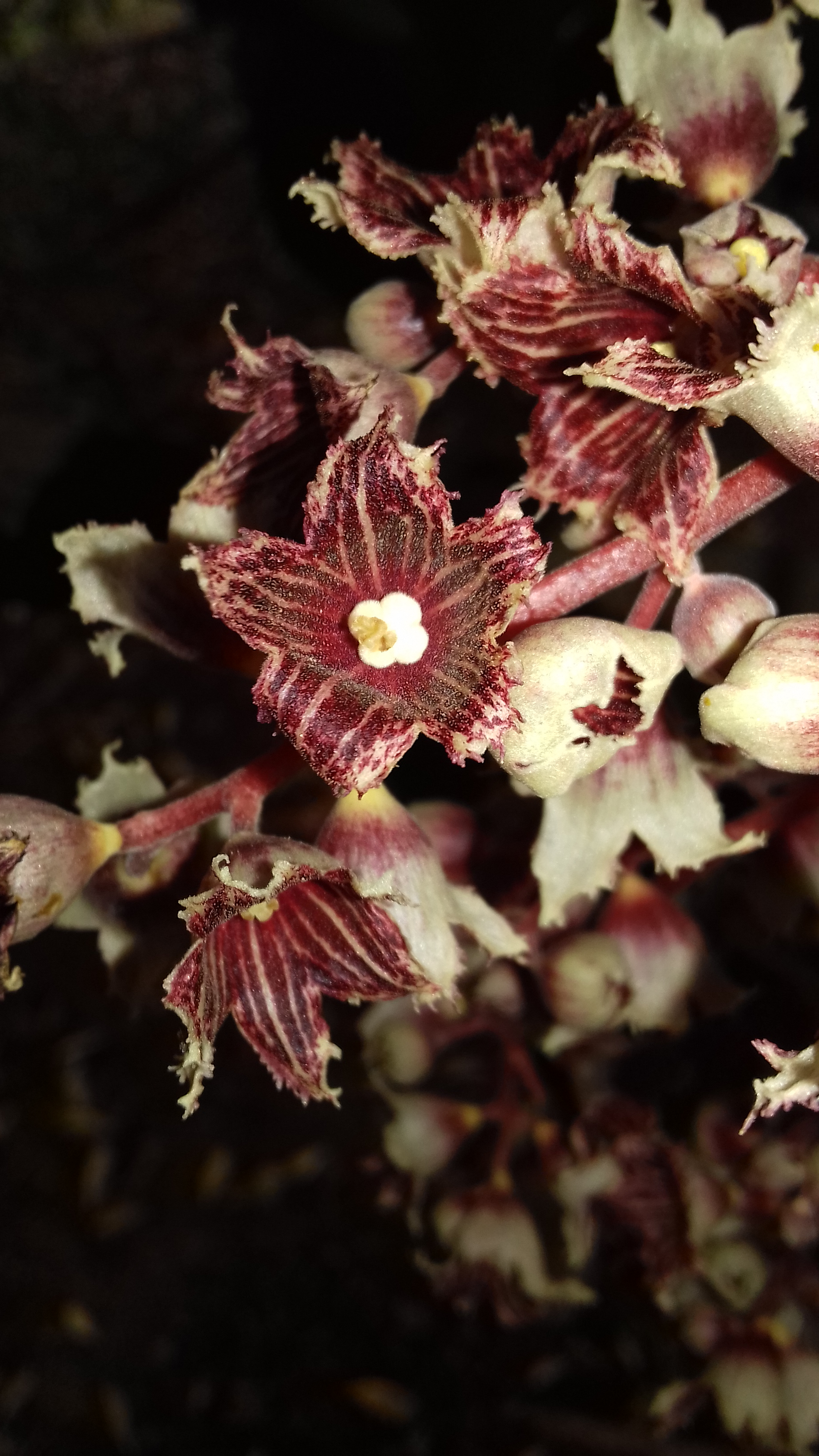
- flowers of A. jaffrei

Scientific classification
- Kingdom: Plantae
- Clade: Tracheophytes
- Clade: Angiosperms
- Clade: Eudicots
- Clade: Rosids
- Order: Malvales
- Family: Malvaceae
- Subfamily: Sterculioideae
- Genus: Acropogon; Schltr.

Type species
- non design.

= Acropogon =

Genus of flowering plants

Acropogon is a genus of flowering plants in the family Malvaceae. The genus is endemic to New Caledonia. It contains around 25 species. Its closest relatives are Australian genera: Argyrodendron, Brachychiton and Franciscodendron.

== List of species ==
As of November 2025, Plants of the World Online accepted 24 species:

- Acropogon aoupiniensis Morat
- Acropogon austrocaledonicus (Hook.f.) Morat
- Acropogon bosseri Morat & Chalopin
- Acropogon bullatus (Pancher & Sebert) Morat
- Acropogon calcicola Morat & Chalopin
- Acropogon chalopiniae Morat
- Acropogon domatifer Morat
- Acropogon dzumacensis (Guillaumin) Morat
- Acropogon fatsioides Schltr.
- Acropogon francii (Guillaumin) Morat
- Acropogon grandiflorus Morat & Chalopin
- Acropogon horarius Gâteblé & Munzinger
- Acropogon jaffrei Morat & Chalopin
- Acropogon macrocarpus Morat & Chalopin
- Acropogon margaretae Morat & Chalopin
- Acropogon megaphyllus (Bureau & Poiss. ex Guillaumin) Morat
- Acropogon merytifolius Morat & Chalopin
- Acropogon mesophilus Munzinger & Gâteblé
- Acropogon moratianus Callm., Munzinger & Lowry
- Acropogon paagoumenensis Morat & Chalopin
- Acropogon pilosus Morat & Chalopin
- Acropogon sageniifolia Schltr.
- Acropogon schefflerifolius (Guillaumin) Morat
- Acropogon schistophilus Morat & Chalopin
- Acropogon schumanniana Schltr.
- Acropogon tireliae Morat & Chalopin
- Acropogon veillonii Morat
