= Pterocymbium dongnaiense =

Scientific classification
- Kingdom: Plantae
- Clade: Tracheophytes
- Clade: Angiosperms
- Clade: Eudicots
- Clade: Rosids
- Order: Malvales
- Family: Malvaceae
- Genus: Pterocymbium
- Species: P. dongnaiense

Binomial name
- Pterocymbium dongnaiense (Pierre) Tardieu

Synonyms
- Sterculia dongnaiensis Pierre; Pterocymbium laoticum Tardieu; Clompanus dongnaiensis (Pierre) Kuntze; Variants: Pterocymbium dongnaiensis, Sterculia donnaiense.

Species of tree

Pterocymbium dongnaiense is a seasonal tropical forest tree species in the family Malvaceae: of the subfamily Sterculioideae (previously placed in the Sterculiaceae). No subspecies are listed in the Catalogue of Life. A deciduous tree growing to about 25 m high, it is found in and adjacent to Dong Nai Province in Vietnam, where it is known as dực nang Ðồng nai.
