= Acropogon merytifolius =

Scientific classification
- Kingdom: Plantae
- Clade: Tracheophytes
- Clade: Angiosperms
- Clade: Eudicots
- Clade: Rosids
- Order: Malvales
- Family: Malvaceae
- Genus: Acropogon
- Species: A. merytifolius

Binomial name
- Acropogon merytifolius Morat & Chalopin

Species of plant

Acropogon merytifolius is a pseudo-palm or Corner Model Tree in the subfamily Sterculioideae of the family Malvaceae, and is and endemic to New Caledonia. The tree is up to about 4 m in height and about 10 cm thick, with a loose cluster of stiff oblanceolate leaves up to 1 m long by about 10 cm wide. The tree is cauliflorous, with small panicles of flowers along the trunk. The tepals have frilly tips. It was described by Morat and Chalopin in 2003.
