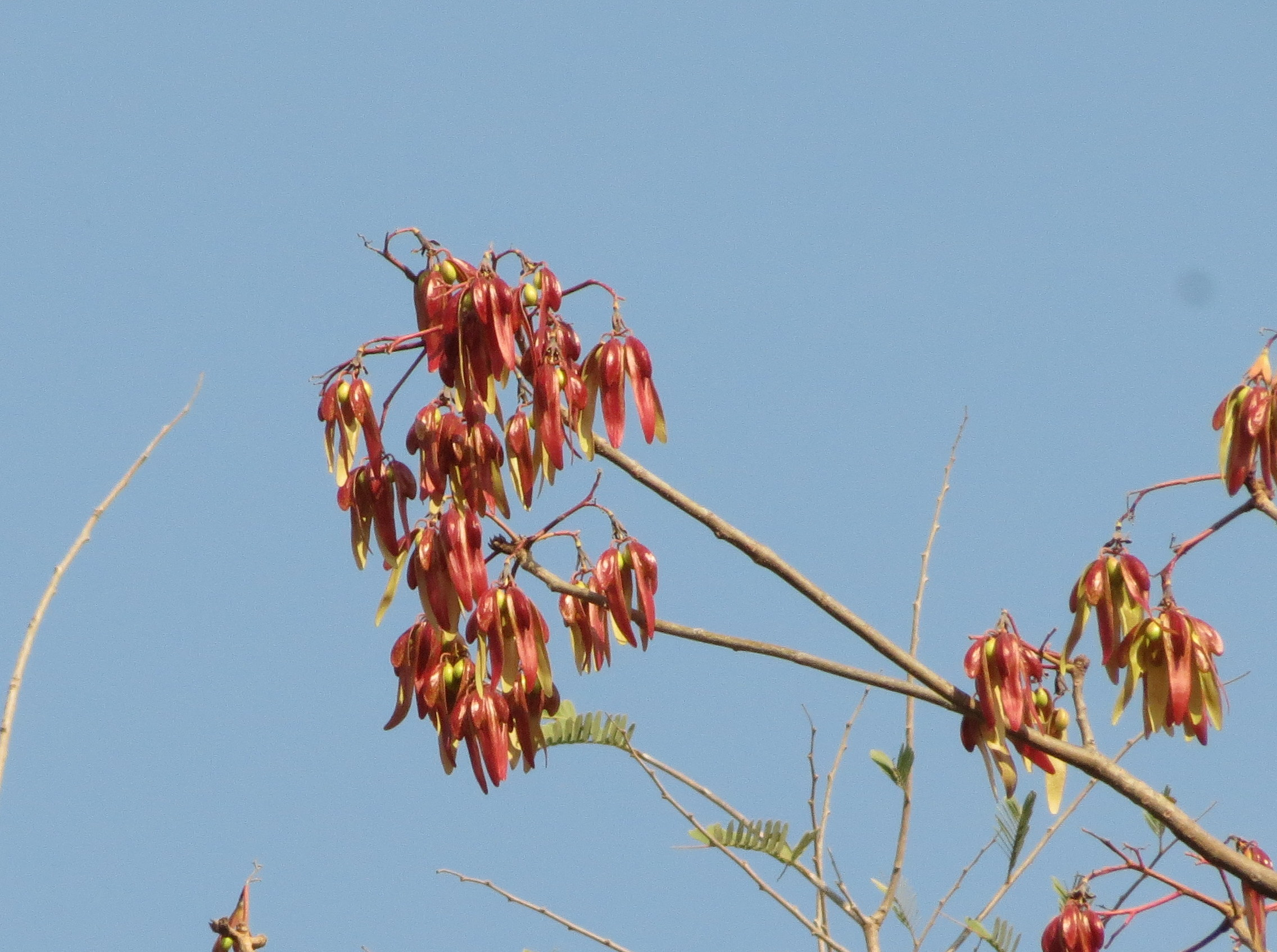
- Pterocymbium tinctorium from Bangalore

Conservation status
- Least Concern (IUCN 3.1)

Scientific classification
- Kingdom: Plantae
- Clade: Embryophytes
- Clade: Tracheophytes
- Clade: Spermatophytes
- Clade: Angiosperms
- Clade: Eudicots
- Clade: Rosids
- Order: Malvales
- Family: Malvaceae
- Genus: Pterocymbium
- Species: P. tinctorium

Binomial name
- Pterocymbium tinctorium (Blanco) Merr.

Synonyms
- Sterculia campanulata Wall. ex Mast. Pterocymbium nicobaricum Didr. Pterocymbium macrocrater Warb. Pterocymbium columnare Pierre; Pterocymbium campanulatum Pierre; Heritiera tinctoria Blanco; Clompanus javanica Kuntze

= Pterocymbium tinctorium =

Species of plant in the family Malvaceae

Pterocymbium tinctorium is a tropical forest tree species in the family Malvaceae, subfamily Sterculioideae (previously placed in the Sterculiaceae). In Vietnam, it is known as dực nang nhuộm. In Indonesia, it is called kelumbuk, where it is a significant timber tree growing to about 25 m high. In Cambodia, it is called Chan Tumpaing (ចាន់ទំពាំង). In the Philippines it is called malasapsap.

== Subspecies ==
The Catalogue of Life lists the following:

- P. tinctorium var. glabrifolium (Kurz) Thoth. - Andaman and Nicobar islands
- P. tinctorium var. javanicum (R. Br.) Kosterm. - Indo-China, Malesia.

== Gallery ==
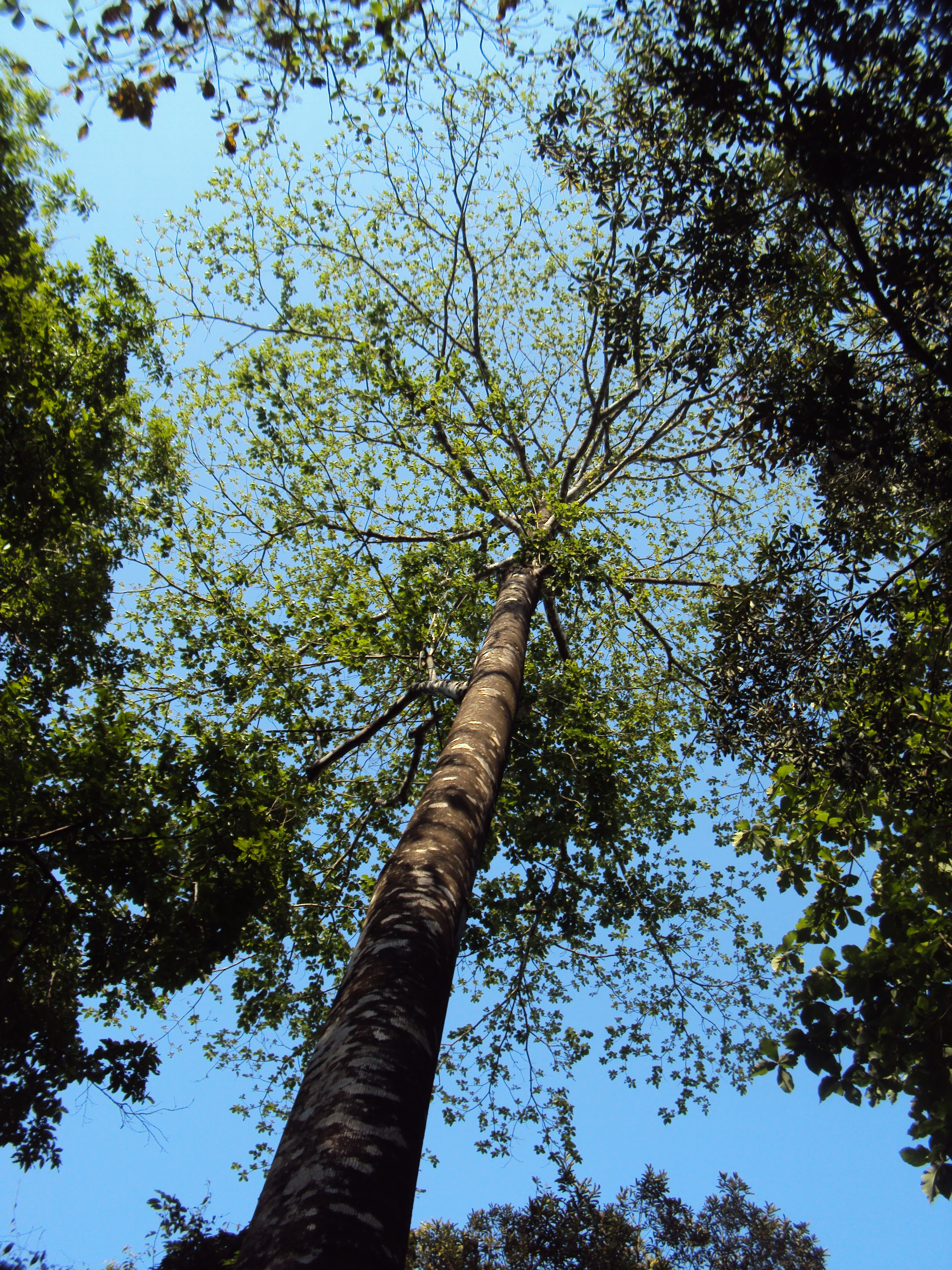

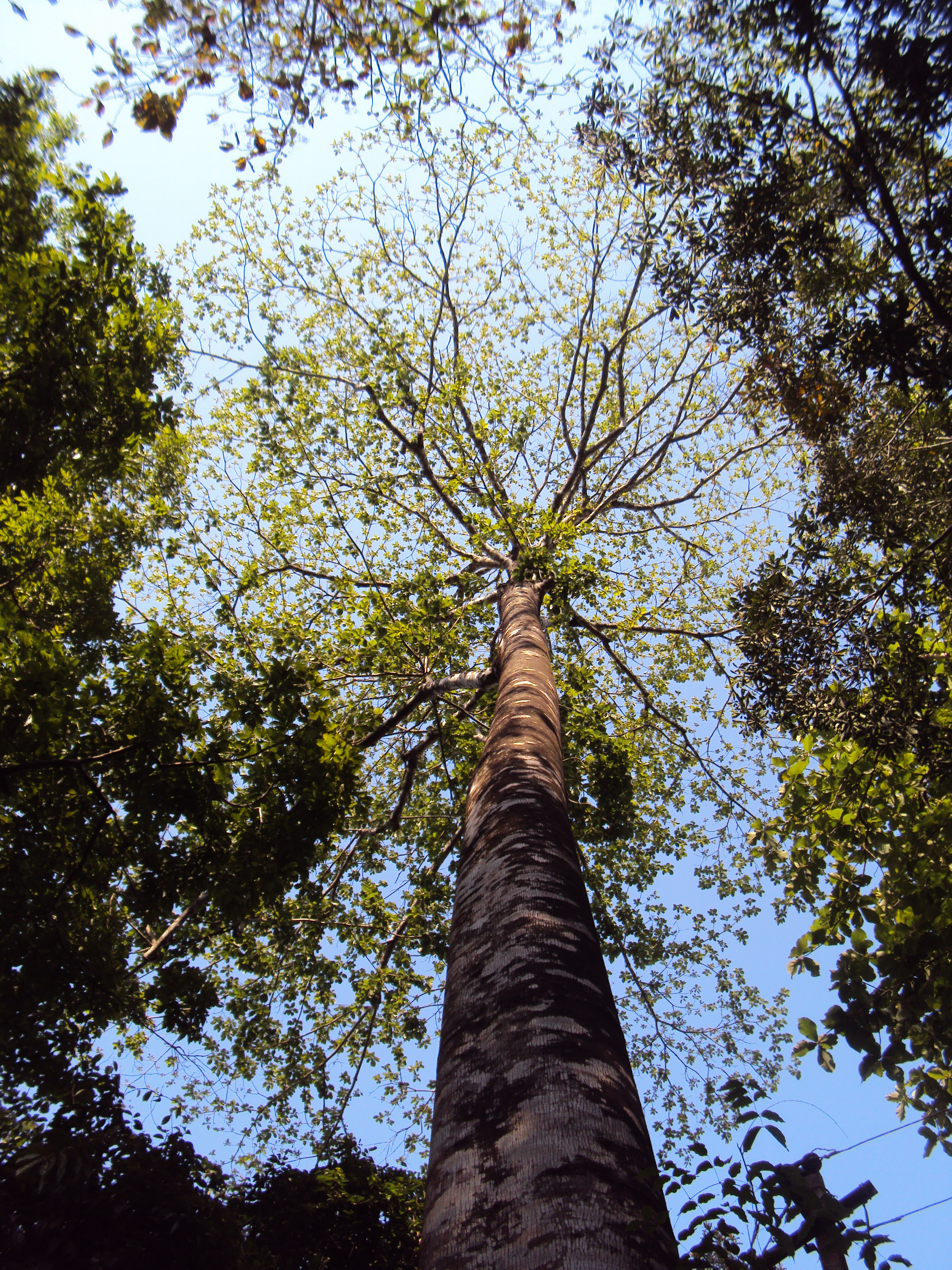

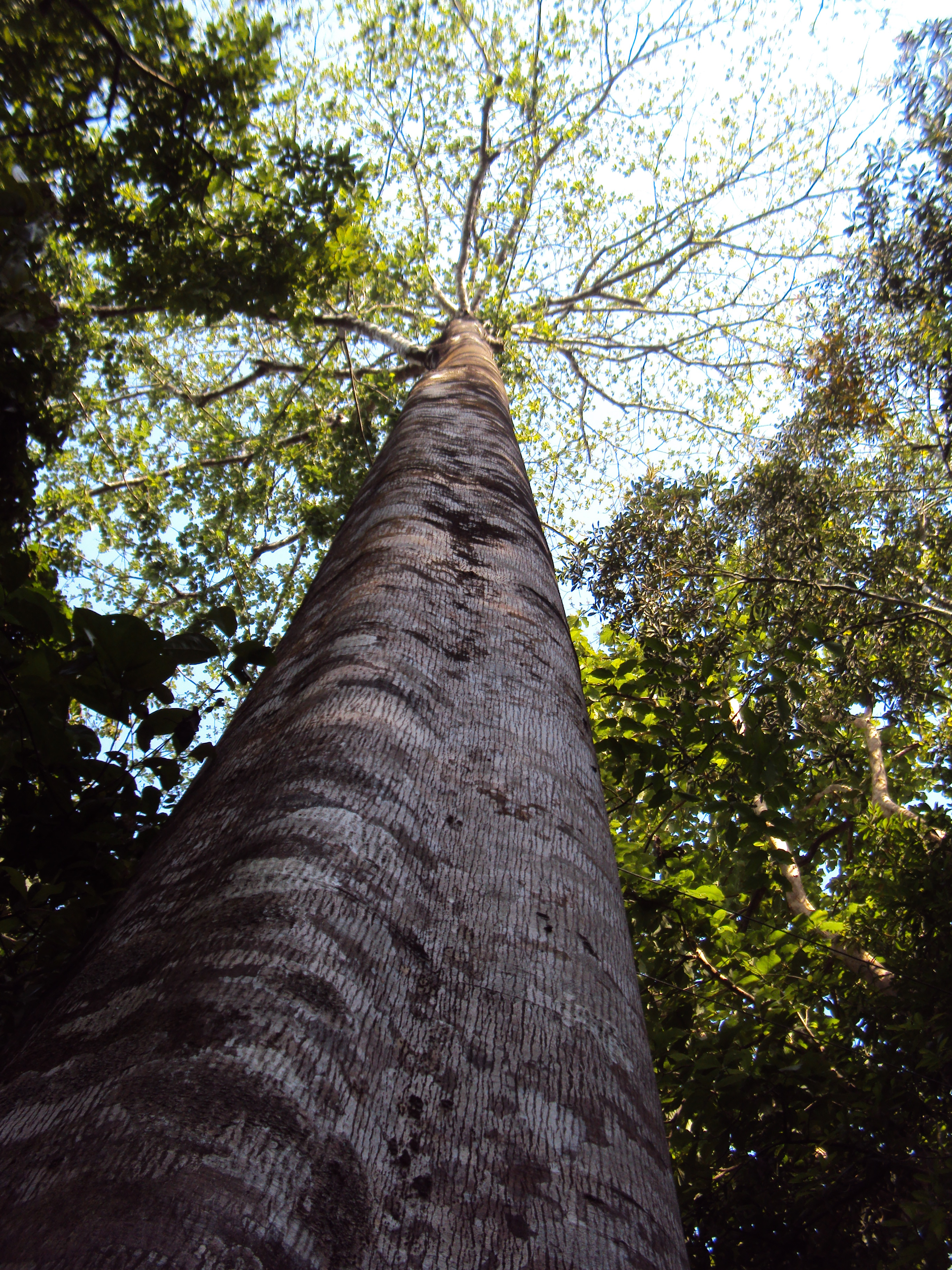

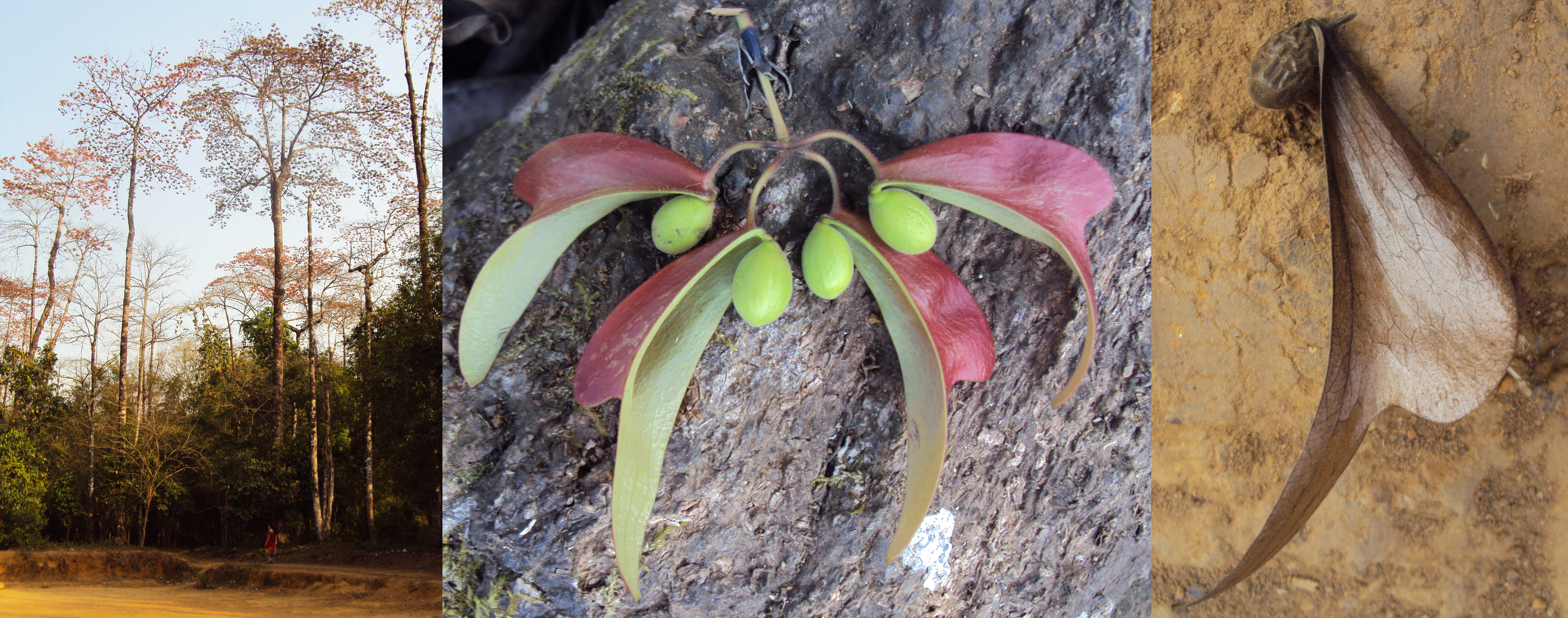

The pictures above show the trunk and canopy of P. tinctorium at the end of the dry season.
