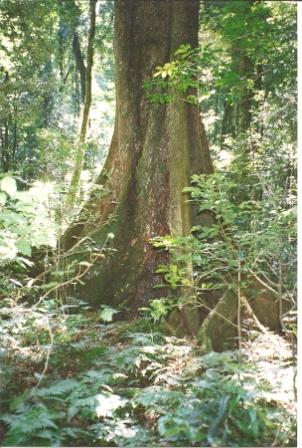
- In Tooloom National Park

Scientific classification
- Kingdom: Plantae
- Clade: Tracheophytes
- Clade: Angiosperms
- Clade: Eudicots
- Clade: Rosids
- Order: Malvales
- Family: Malvaceae
- Genus: Argyrodendron
- Species: A. actinophyllum

Binomial name
- Argyrodendron actinophyllum (F.M.Bailey) Edlin

Synonyms
- List: Heritiera actinophylla (F.M.Bailey) Kosterm.; Heritiera actinophylla (F.M.Bailey) Kosterm. isonym; Tarrietia actinodendron Guilf. nom. inval., nom. nud.; Tarrietia actinophylla F.M.Bailey; Tarrietia argyrodendron var. actinophylla F.Muell.; Argyrodendron trifoliolatum auct. non F.Muell. (1858); Tarrietia argyrodendron auct. non Benth.: Mueller, F.J.H. von (May 1875)

= Argyrodendron actinophyllum =

Species of tree

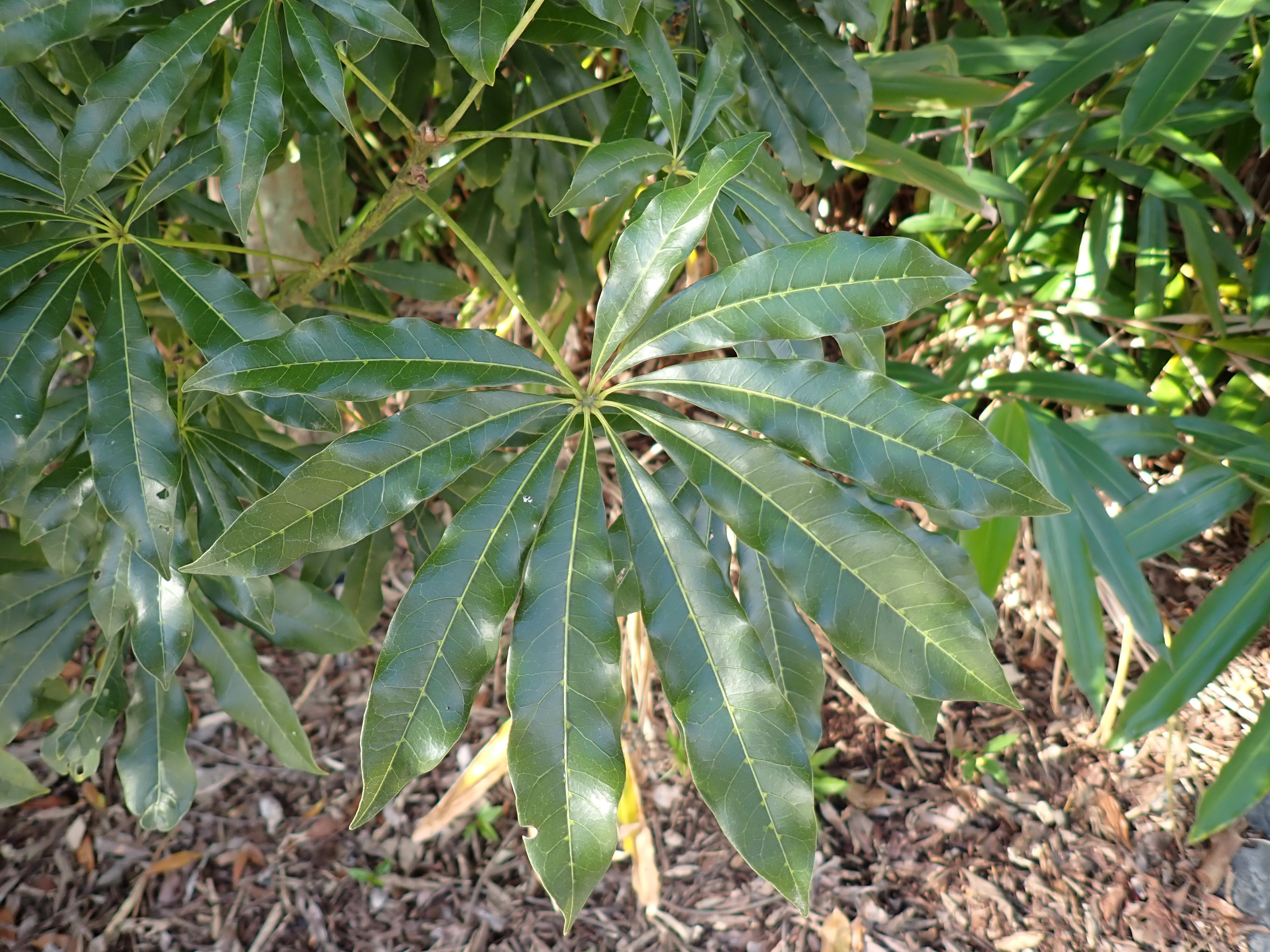
Leaf in Mount Coot-tha Botanic Gardens

Argyrodendron actinophyllum, commonly known as black booyong, black jack, stave wood, Mackay tulip oak, crowsfoot elm, booyong, tulip oak or blush tulip oak, is a species of flowering plant in the family Malvaceae and is endemic to eastern Australia. It is a large tree with prominent buttress roots, palmately compound leaves with 5 to 9 lance-shaped leaflets, flower arranged in panicles, and winged samaras.

== Description ==
Argyrodendron actinophyllum is a tree that typically grows to a height of 50 m (160 ft) with prominent buttress roots and dark grey or very dark grey bark. The leaves are palmately compound with 5 to 9 lance-shaped leaflets, sometimes the narrower end towards the base, 100–180 mm (3.9–7.1 in) long and 15–50 mm (0.59–1.97 in) wide on a petiole 30–50 mm (1.2–2.0 in) long. The flowers are arranged in many-flowered panicles that are longer than the leaves. The fruit is an oval samara 5–7 mm (0.20–0.28 in) in diameter, with a wing 40–60 mm (1.6–2.4 in) long and 15–25 mm (0.59–0.98 in) wide.

== Taxonomy ==
This species was first formally described in 1875 by Ferdinand von Mueller who gave it the name Tarrietia argyrodendron var. actinophylla in his Fragmenta Phytographiae Australiae. In 1935, Herbert L. Edlin raised the variety to species status as Argyrodendron actinophyllum in the journal, New Phytologist. The specific epithet actinophyllum means 'spoke of a wheel-leaved'.

In 1969, Lindsay Stuart Smith described the subspecies Argyrodendron actinophyllum subsp. diversifolium, and the name, and that of the autonym are accepted by the Australian Plant Census, but not accepted by the National Herbarium of New South Wales:

- Argyrodendron actinophyllum subsp. actinophyllum
- Argyrodendron actinophyllum subsp. diversifolium

== Distribution and habitat ==
Black booyong grows in warm rainforest, mostly above 600 m (2,000 ft), north from Gloucester in New South Wales and in north-east and central-eastern Queensland.
