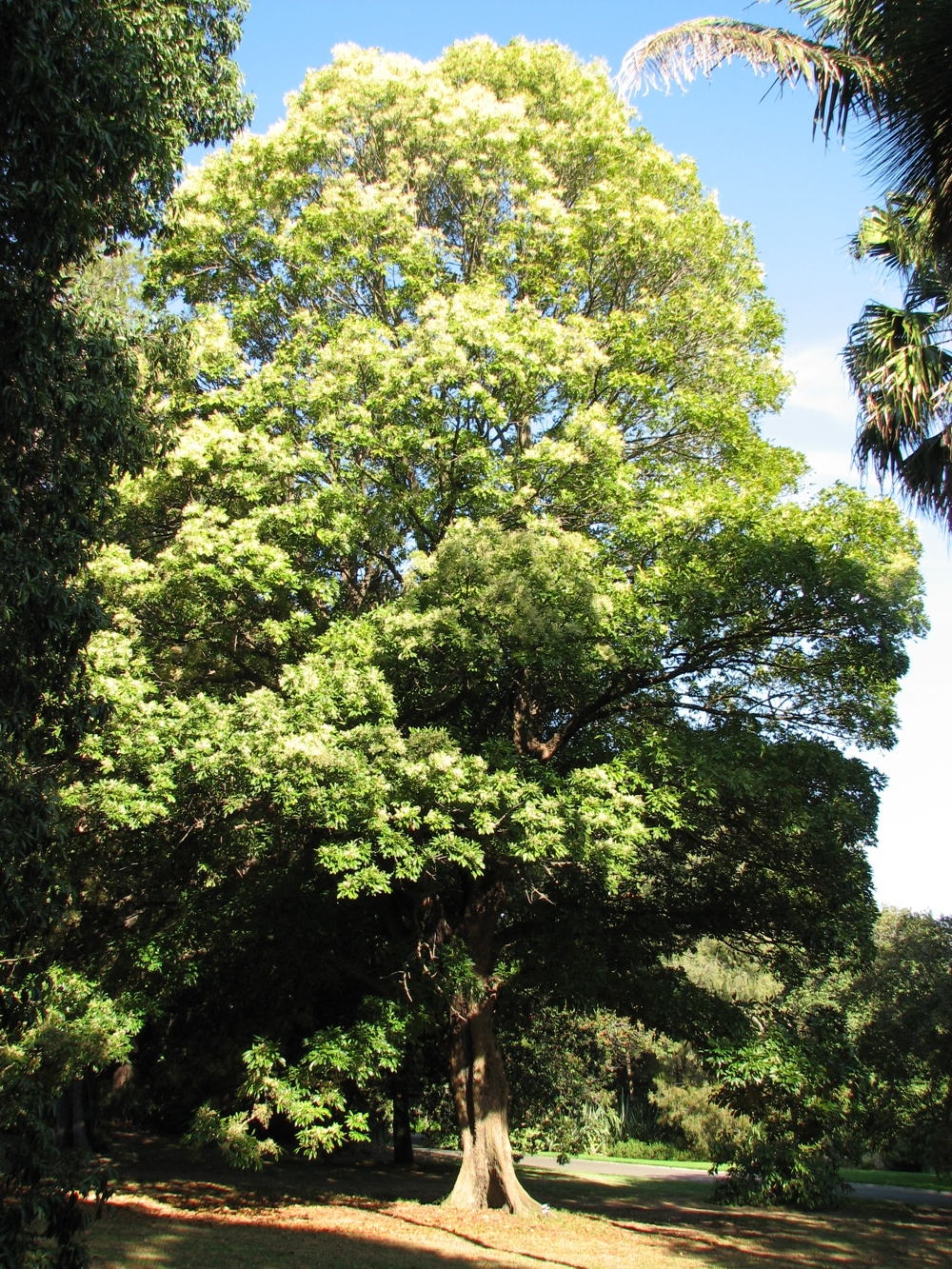
- Argyrodendron actinophyllum

Scientific classification
- Kingdom: Plantae
- Clade: Embryophytes
- Clade: Tracheophytes
- Clade: Spermatophytes
- Clade: Angiosperms
- Clade: Eudicots
- Clade: Rosids
- Order: Malvales
- Family: Malvaceae
- Subfamily: Sterculioideae
- Genus: Argyrodendron; F.Muell.

Species
- See text

= Argyrodendron =

Genus of flowering plants

Argyrodendron is a genus of flowering plants in the family Malvaceae. Species of Argyrodendron are found in Indonesia, New Guinea, the Philippines and Australia.

== Description ==
Plants in the genus Argyrodendron are tall trees, usually with buttress roots, the new growth and leaves often covered with shield-shaped scales. The leaves are usually palmately compound with 3 to 9 leaflets. The flowers are arranged in panicles in leaf axils with either male or female flowers. The sepals are cup-shaped with 5 lobes and white or cream-coloured, but there are no petals. Female flowers have 3 to 5 sessile carpels each with a single ovule, joined styles and 15 staminodes at the base. The fruit is a winged samara with a more or less spherical nut at the base.

== Taxonomy ==
The genus Argyrodendron was first formally described in 1858 by Ferdinand von Mueller in his Fragmenta Phytographiae Australiae and the first species he described (the type species) was A. trifoliatum. The genus name is derived from ancient Greek argyros meaning "silver" and dendron meaning "a tree", referring to the silvery underside of the leaves.

== Species list ==
The following species of Argyrodendron are accepted by Plants of the World Online as at June 2024:

- Argyrodendron actinophyllum (F.Muell.) Edlin
- Argyrodendron peralatum (F.M.Bailey) Edlin ex I.H.Boas
- Argyrodendron polyandrum L.S.Sm.
- Argyrodendron trifoliolatum F.Muell.
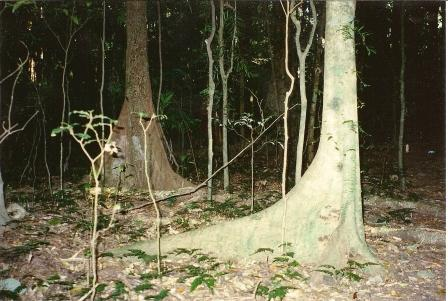
A. actinophyllum (black booyong) and A. trifoliolatum (white booyong) - Toonumbar National Park
