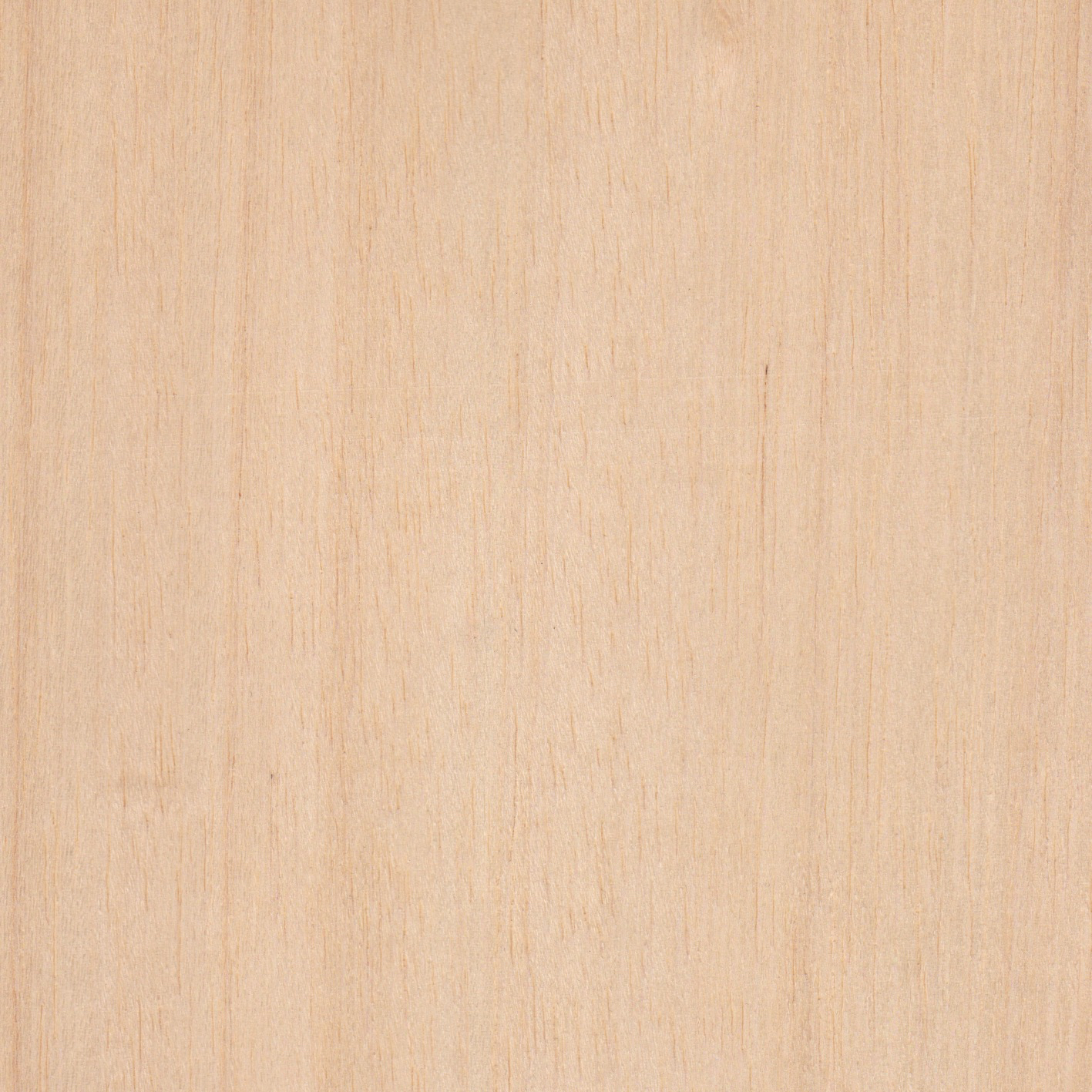
- Wood

Conservation status
- Vulnerable (IUCN 2.3)

Scientific classification
- Kingdom: Plantae
- Clade: Tracheophytes
- Clade: Angiosperms
- Clade: Eudicots
- Clade: Rosids
- Order: Malvales
- Family: Malvaceae
- Genus: Pterygota
- Species: P. bequaertii

Binomial name
- Pterygota bequaertii De Wild.
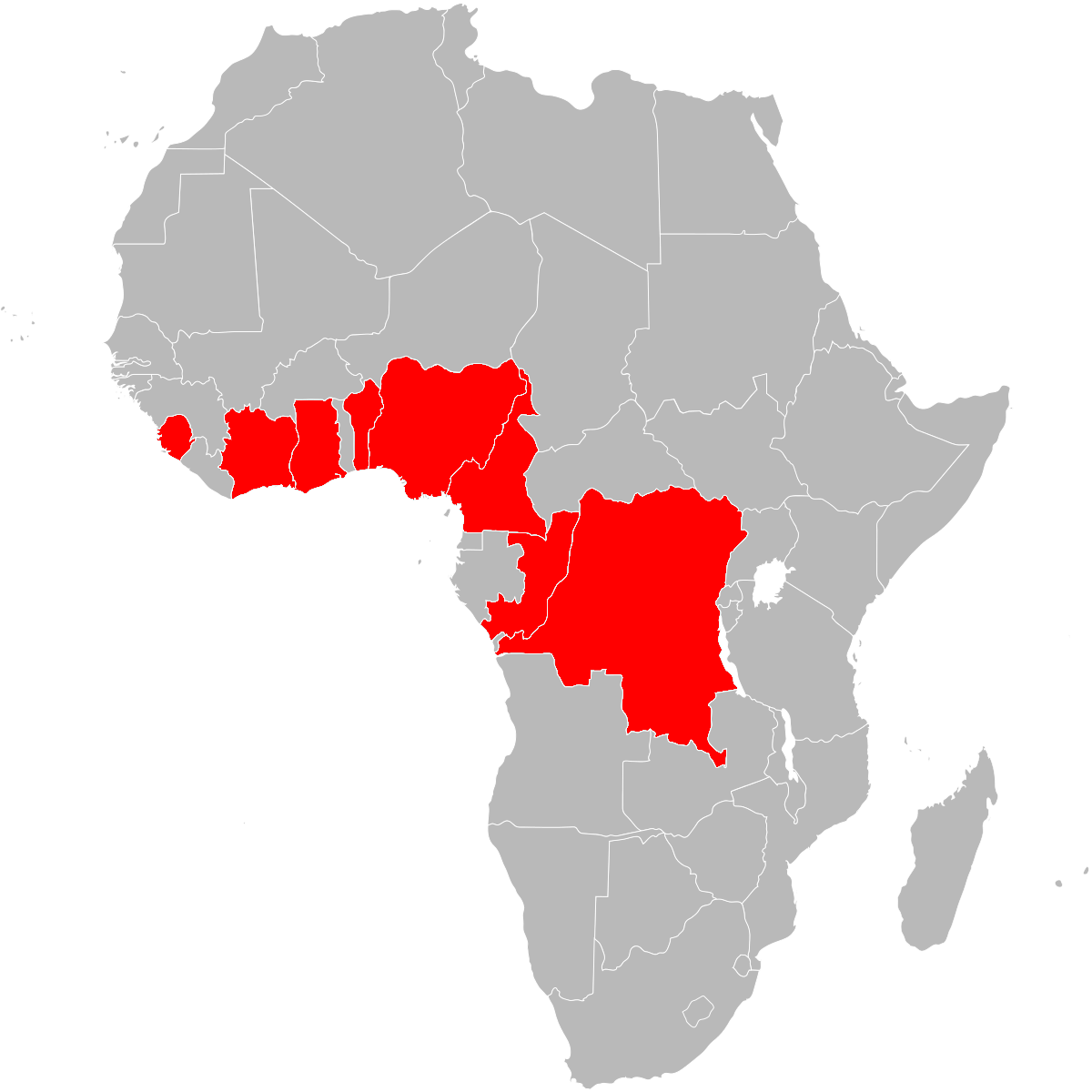
- approximate range

Synonyms
- Pterygota aubrevillei Pellegr. Sterculia bayakensis Pellegr.

= Pterygota bequaertii =

Species of flowering plant

Pterygota bequaertii is a species of flowering plant in the family Malvaceae. It is found in Cameroon, Republic of Congo, Democratic Republic of the Congo, Ivory Coast, Gabon, Ghana, and Nigeria. It is threatened by exploitation as a timber tree. The wood has the trade name koto.
