= Octolobus =

Scientific classification
- Kingdom: Plantae
- Clade: Tracheophytes
- Clade: Angiosperms
- Clade: Eudicots
- Clade: Rosids
- Order: Malvales
- Family: Malvaceae
- Subfamily: Sterculioideae
- Genus: Octolobus; Welw.

Genus of trees

Octolobus is a genus of tropical forest trees in the family Malvaceae, subfamily Sterculioideae (previously placed in the Sterculiaceae). They are found in Central and West Africa and are closely related to the genus Cola. Both share a leaf structure with entire margins, featuring a cuneate base, three main veins, a pulvinus at the petiole tip, weak brochidodromous secondary veins, and multicellular glandular hairs on the epidermis.

== Species ==
Plants of the World Online lists:

1. Octolobus grandis Exell
2. Octolobus heteromerus K.Schum.
3. Octolobus spectabilis Welw. - type species
