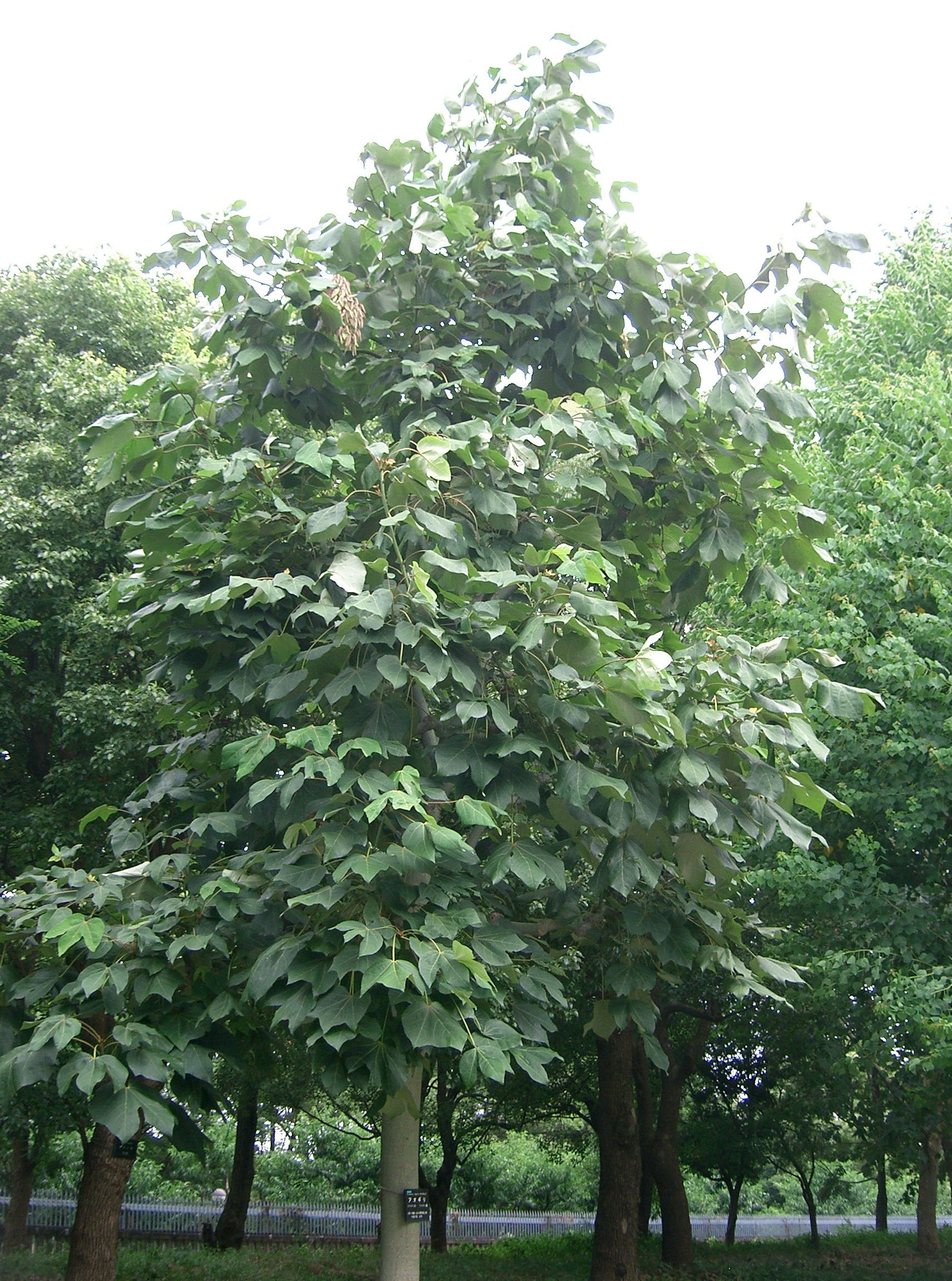
- Firmiana simplex

Scientific classification
- Kingdom: Plantae
- Clade: Tracheophytes
- Clade: Angiosperms
- Clade: Eudicots
- Clade: Rosids
- Order: Malvales
- Family: Malvaceae
- Subfamily: Sterculioideae
- Genus: Firmiana; Marsili, 1786

Synonyms
- Erythropsis Lindl.; Karaka Raf.

= Firmiana =

Genus of flowering plants

Firmiana is a genus of flowering plant in the family Malvaceae, native to tropical and temperate south, southeast, and Eastern Asia to New Guinea and the southwest Pacific. It was formerly placed in the now defunct family Sterculiaceae and may sometimes be called the "parasol tree". The genus name honours Karl Joseph von Firmian. The defining characteristic of the genus Firmiana is the development of the fruit. Shortly after pollination the five carpels unfold to be flat and turn green with four developing seeds attached to the edge, fully exposed to the environment.

== Species ==
Plants of the World Online accepts 18 species.

1. Firmiana bracteata DC.
2. Firmiana calcarea C.F.Liang & S.L.Mo ex Y.S.Huang
3. Firmiana colorata (Roxb.) R.Br.
4. Firmiana danxiaensis H.H.Hsue & H.S.Kiu
5. Firmiana daweishanensis Gui L.Zhang & J.Y.Xiang
6. Firmiana diversifolia A.Gray
7. Firmiana fulgens (Wall. ex Mast.) K.Schum.
8. Firmiana hainanensis Kosterm.
9. Firmiana kerrii (Craib) Kosterm.
10. Firmiana kwangsiensis H.H.Hsue
11. Firmiana major (W.W.Sm.) Hand.-Mazz.
12. Firmiana malayana Kosterm.
13. Firmiana minahassae (Koord.) Kosterm.
14. Firmiana papuana Mildbr.
15. Firmiana pulcherrima H.H.Hsue
16. Firmiana simplex (L.) W.Wight — Chinese parasol tree, or wutong
17. Firmiana subglabra (V.Abraham & Dutt) Kosterm.
18. Firmiana sumbawaensis Kosterm.

== Gallery ==
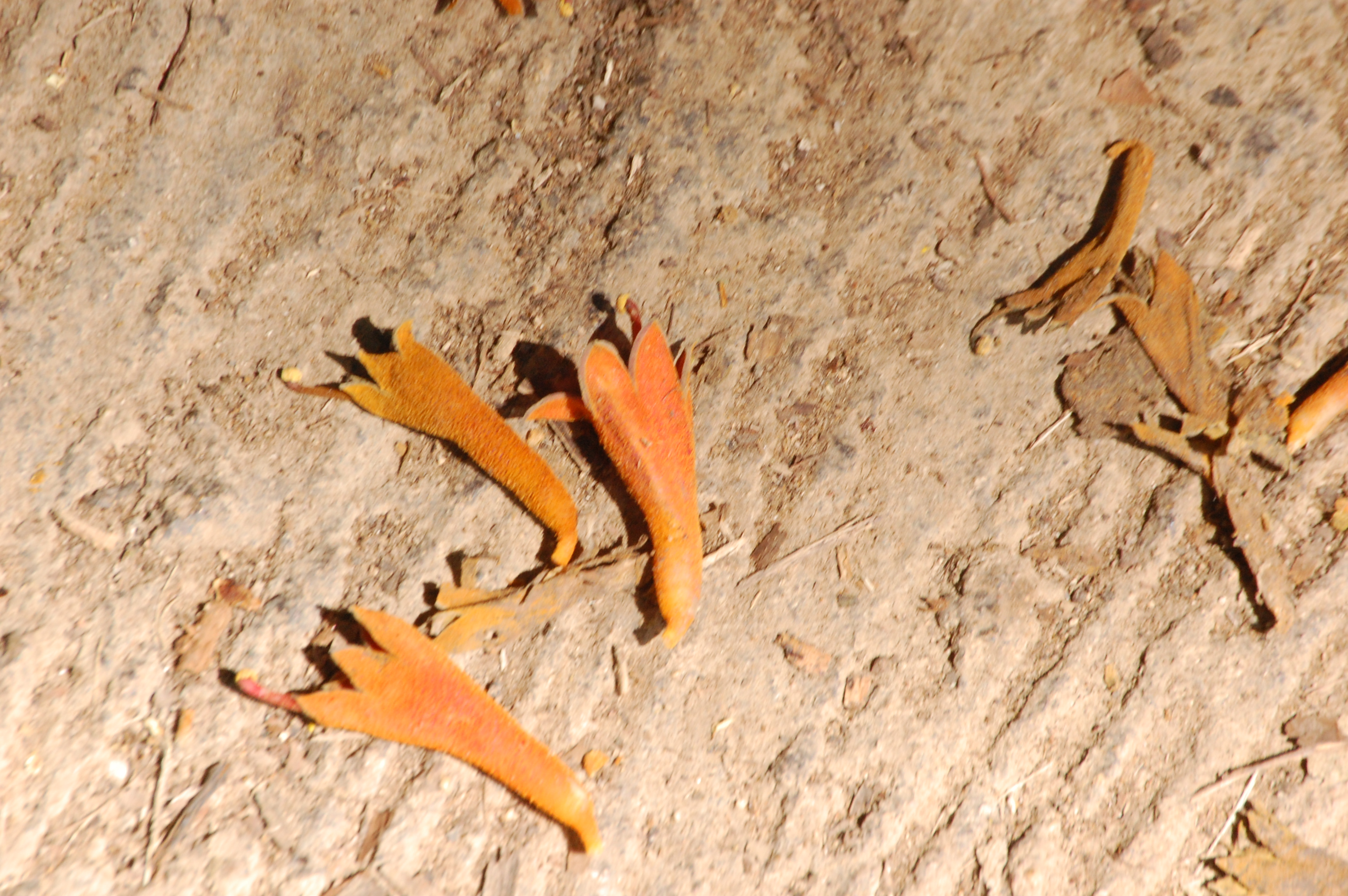
Firmiana colorata

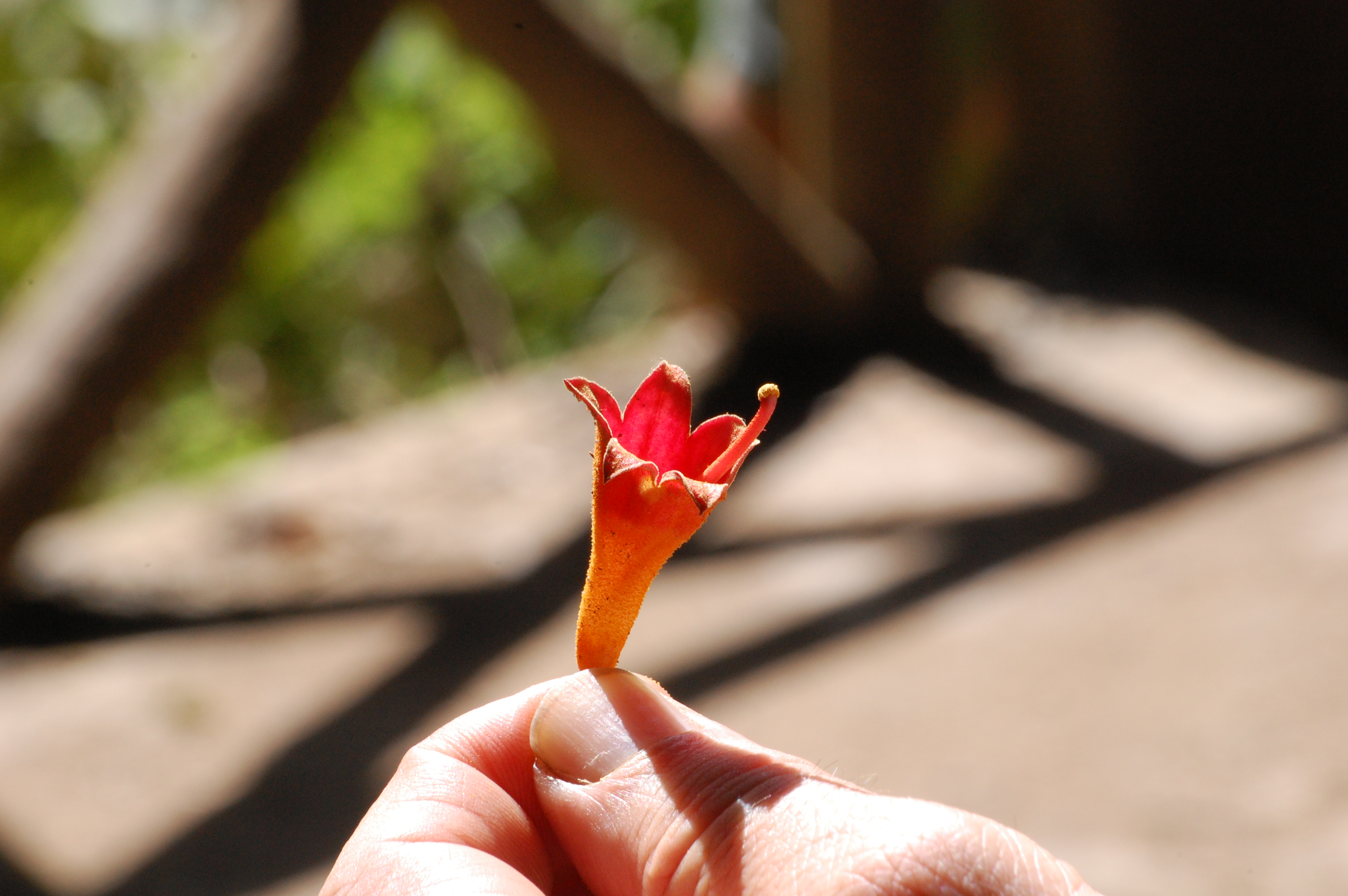

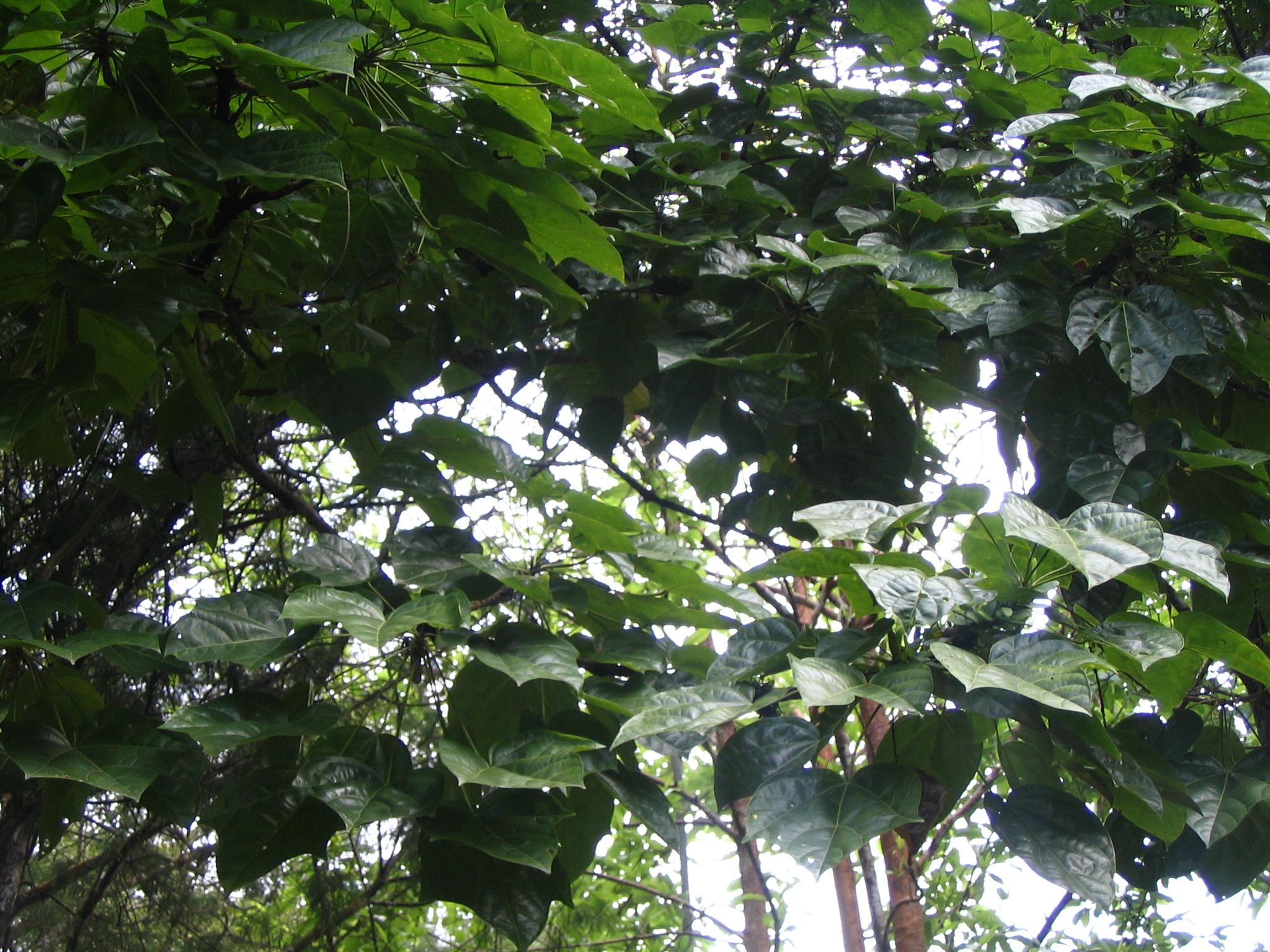

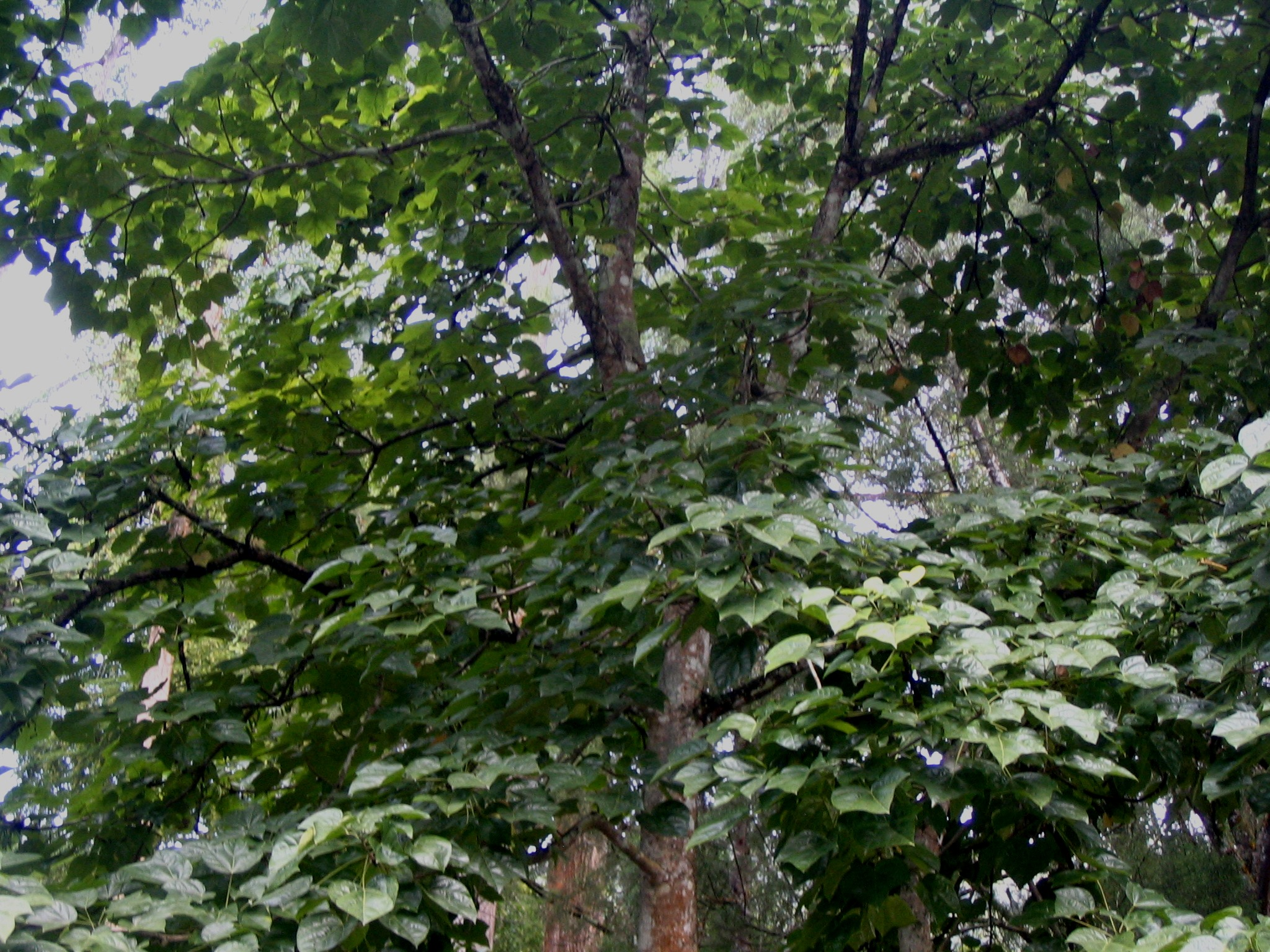

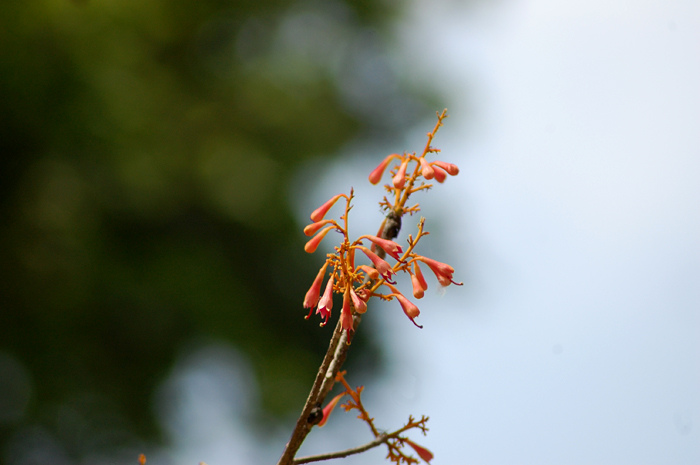
Firmiana colorata

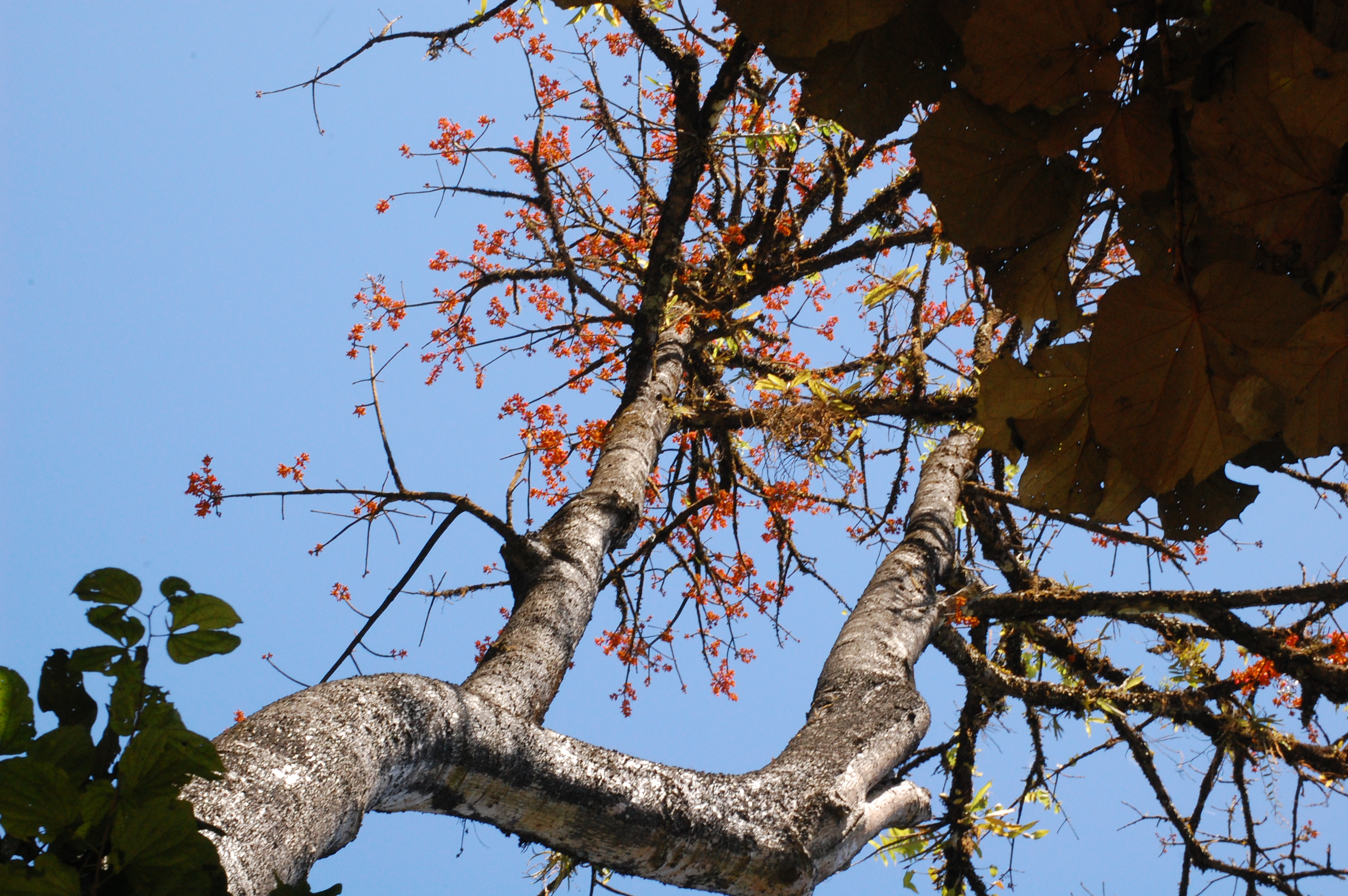

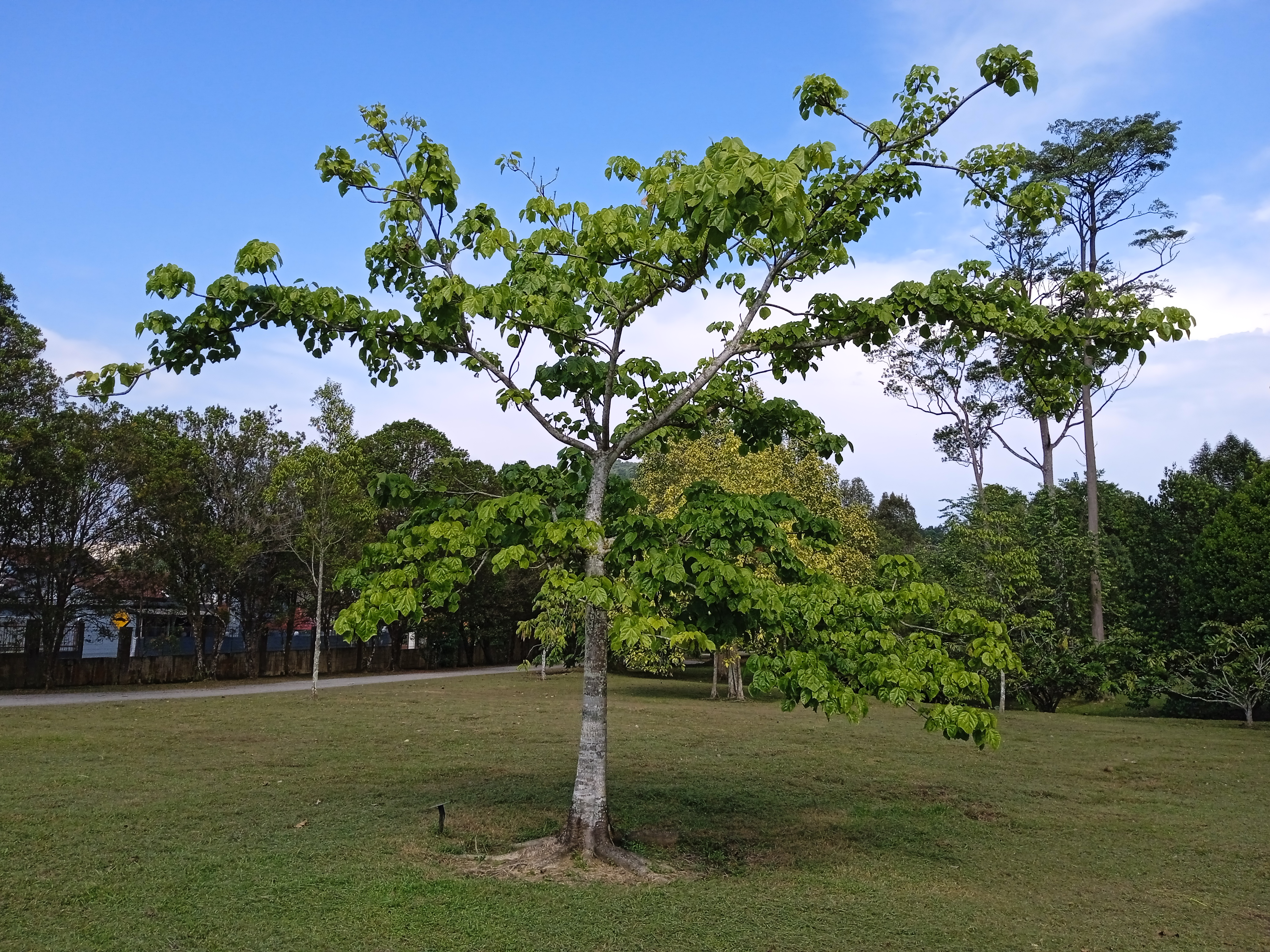
Firmiana malayana
