= Acropogon veillonii =

Conservation status
- Vulnerable (IUCN 3.1)

Scientific classification
- Kingdom: Plantae
- Clade: Tracheophytes
- Clade: Angiosperms
- Clade: Eudicots
- Clade: Rosids
- Order: Malvales
- Family: Malvaceae
- Genus: Acropogon
- Species: A. veillonii

Binomial name
- Acropogon veillonii Morat

Species of flowering plant

Acropogon veillonii is a species of flowering plant in the family Malvaceae. It is found only in New Caledonia.
