= Firmiana hainanensis =

Conservation status
- Vulnerable (IUCN 2.3)

Scientific classification
- Kingdom: Plantae
- Clade: Tracheophytes
- Clade: Angiosperms
- Clade: Eudicots
- Clade: Rosids
- Order: Malvales
- Family: Malvaceae
- Genus: Firmiana
- Species: F. hainanensis

Binomial name
- Firmiana hainanensis Kosterm.

Species of flowering plant

Firmiana hainanensis is a species of flowering plant in the family Malvaceae. It is found only in China. It is threatened by habitat loss.
