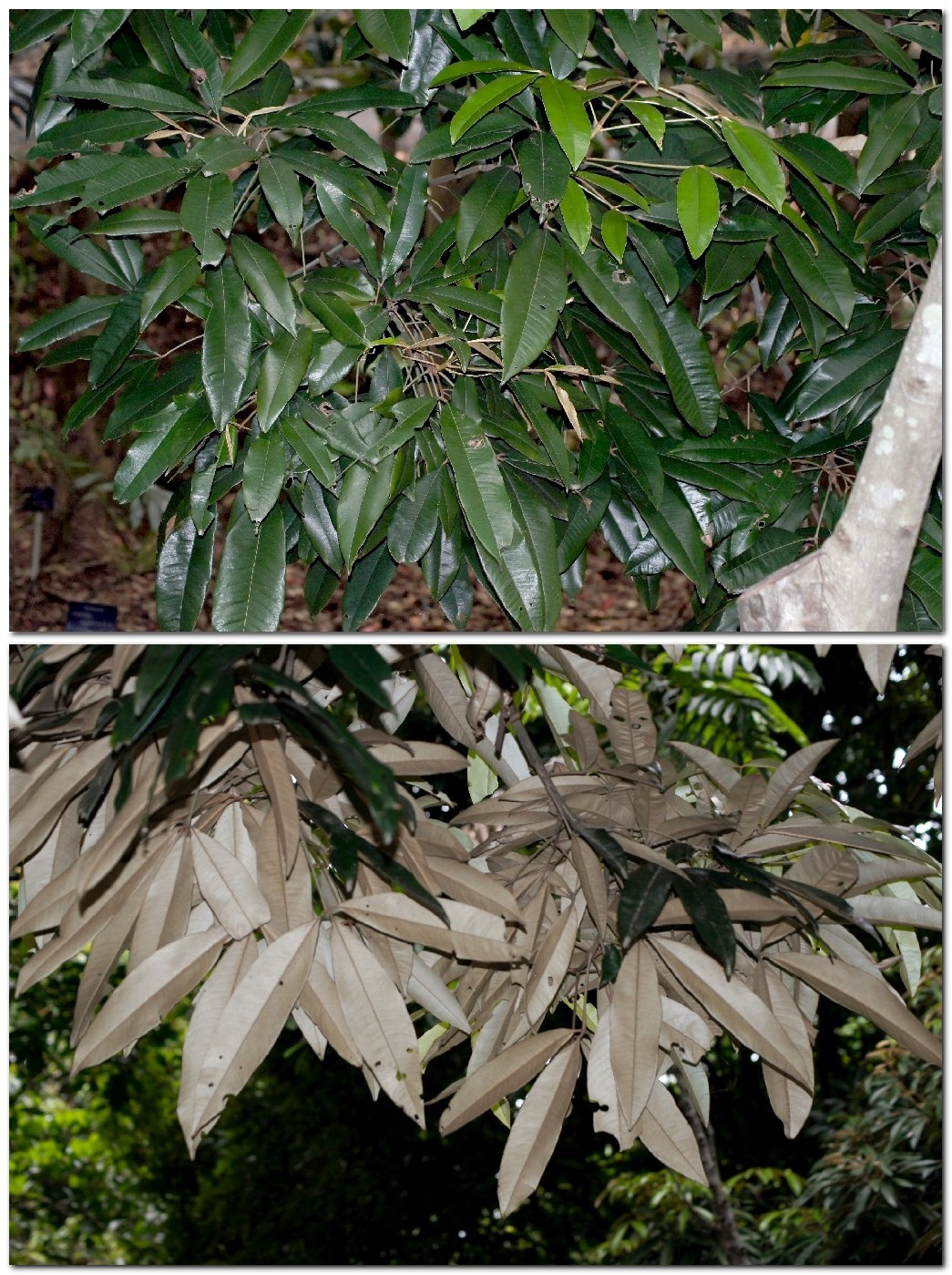

Scientific classification
- Kingdom: Plantae
- Clade: Tracheophytes
- Clade: Angiosperms
- Clade: Eudicots
- Clade: Rosids
- Order: Malvales
- Family: Malvaceae
- Genus: Argyrodendron
- Species: A. peralatum

Binomial name
- Argyrodendron peralatum (F.M.Bailey) Edlin ex J.H.Boas

= Argyrodendron peralatum =

Species of tree in the family Malvaceae

Argyrodendron peralatum is a species of tree in the family Malvaceae. The trees are more commonly known as in the red tulip oak or red crowsfoot. They are endemic to northeastern Queensland, Australia between Tully and Cooktown. The most distinctive feature of Argyrodendron peralatum is that the trunks form large characteristic buttress roots.
