= Firmiana major =

Conservation status
- Endangered (IUCN 3.1)

Scientific classification
- Kingdom: Plantae
- Clade: Tracheophytes
- Clade: Angiosperms
- Clade: Eudicots
- Clade: Rosids
- Order: Malvales
- Family: Malvaceae
- Genus: Firmiana
- Species: F. major

Binomial name
- Firmiana major W. Smith Hand.-Mazz.

Species of flowering plant

Firmiana major is a species of flowering plant in the family Malvaceae. It is found only in China, in Sichuan and Yunnan provinces. It is threatened by habitat loss.
