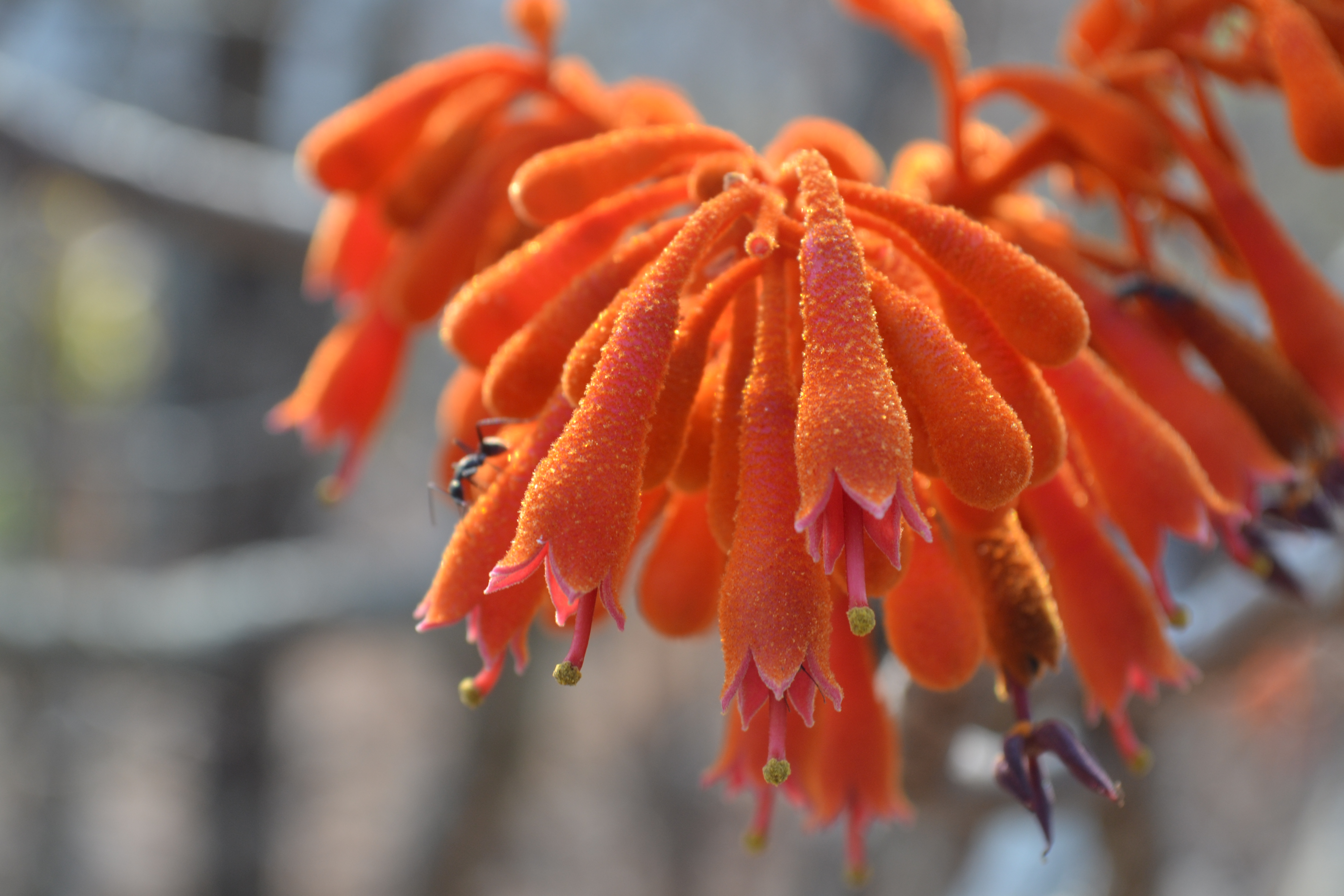
- Flowers

Conservation status
- Least Concern (IUCN 3.1)

Scientific classification
- Kingdom: Plantae
- Clade: Tracheophytes
- Clade: Angiosperms
- Clade: Eudicots
- Clade: Rosids
- Order: Malvales
- Family: Malvaceae
- Genus: Firmiana
- Species: F. colorata

Binomial name
- Firmiana colorata (Roxb.) R.Br.

Synonyms
- Clompanus colorata (Roxb.) Kuntze; Erythropsis colorata (Roxb.) Burkill; Karaka colorata (Roxb.) Raf.; Sterculia colorata Roxb.; Firmiana rubriflora Kosterm.; Sterculia rubicunda Wall. ex Mast.

= Firmiana colorata =

Species of tree

Firmiana colorata, the scarlet sterculia (also known as bonfire tree, coloured sterculia and Indian almond, in Assamese ওদাল (odal) and in Marathi known as "कौशी" [kaushi]), is a medium-sized tree with spreading branches. It sheds leaves before the onset of flowering. After leaf-shedding, buds sprout and develop into flowers. The tree flowers from March to April.

It produces flowers in short dense panicles which occur at the ends of the branches. The flowers are orange-red in colour and hang downwards. The flowering stalks together with flowers are covered with fine downy hairs giving the whole inflorescence a soft, velvety look. During flowering phase, the Scarlet Sterculia is quite prominent and presents a brilliant sight because of its orange-red flowers against a leafless state.

The flowers are large, 30 millimetres (1.2 in) long. The flower tube is 13 millimetres (0.51 in) long, tubular at the base and lobed at the tip. Its rim is surrounded by white soft hair. The corolla looks like it is united inside with the tubular sepals at the base. From the centre of the calyx tube, a staminal column protrudes bearing at its summit 30 anthers.

Scarlet sterculia is common in the forests of the Western Ghats and the Deccan of the Indian subcontinent.
