= Pterygota macrocarpa =

Conservation status
- Vulnerable (IUCN 2.3)

Scientific classification
- Kingdom: Plantae
- Clade: Tracheophytes
- Clade: Angiosperms
- Clade: Eudicots
- Clade: Rosids
- Order: Malvales
- Family: Malvaceae
- Genus: Pterygota
- Species: P. macrocarpa

Binomial name
- Pterygota macrocarpa K.Schum.

Species of flowering plant

Pterygota macrocarpa is a species of flowering plant in the family Malvaceae. It is found in Cameroon, Ivory Coast, Ghana, Nigeria, and Sierra Leone. It is threatened by habitat loss.
