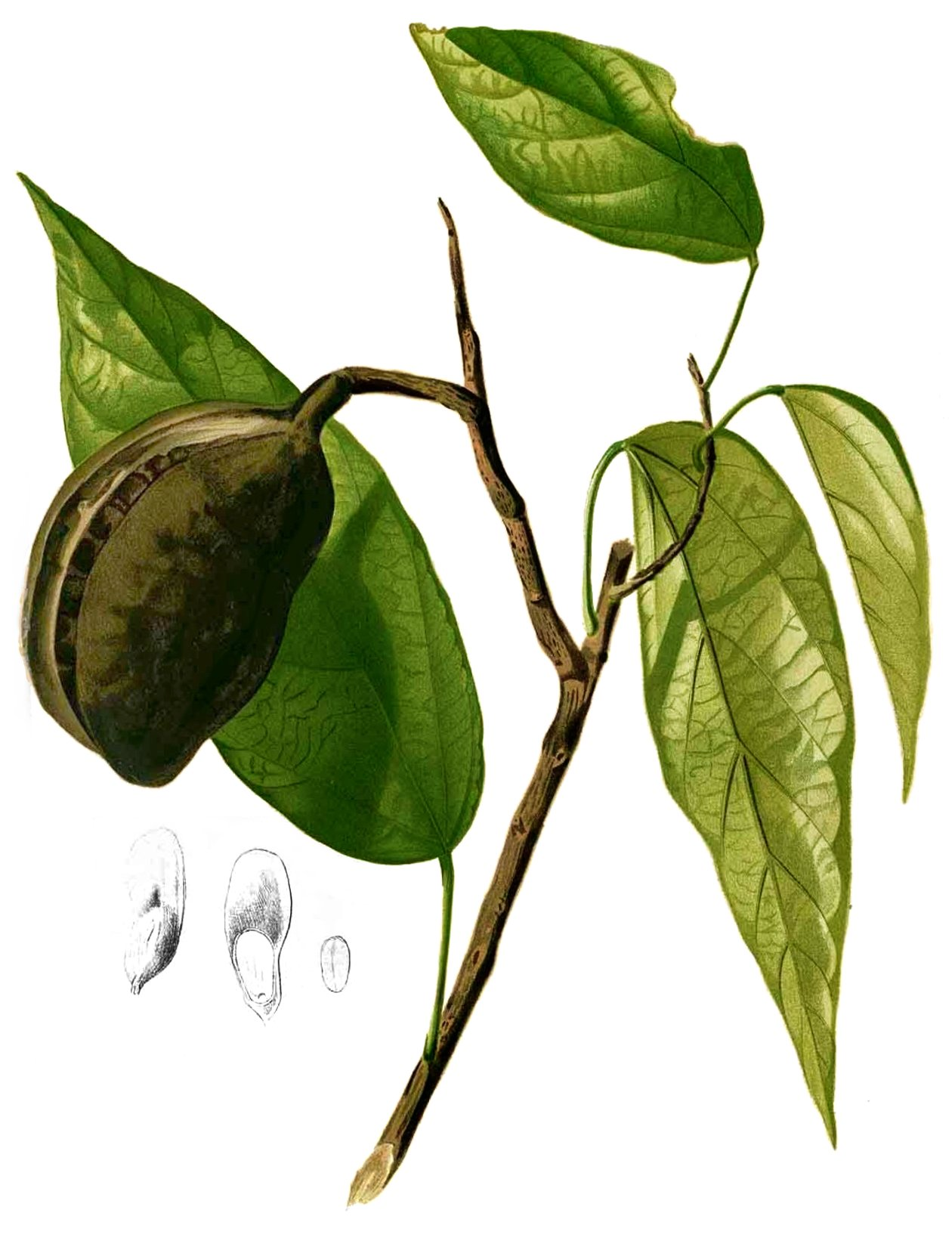
- Pterygota alata

Scientific classification
- Kingdom: Plantae
- Clade: Tracheophytes
- Clade: Angiosperms
- Clade: Eudicots
- Clade: Rosids
- Order: Malvales
- Family: Malvaceae
- Subfamily: Sterculioideae
- Genus: Pterygota; Schott & Endl.

Species
- 21; see text

Synonyms
- Basiloxylon K.Schum.; Tetradia R.Br.

= Pterygota (plant) =

Genus of flowering plants

Pterygota is a genus of flowering plants in the family Malvaceae.

In older systems of classification, it was placed in Sterculiaceae, but all members of that family are now in an expanded Malvaceae.

Pterygota has a pantropical distribution.

== Species ==
21 species are accepted.

- Pterygota adolfi-friederici Engl. & K.Krause
- Pterygota alata (Roxb.) R.Br. – Buddha coconut
- Pterygota amazonica L.O.Williams ex Dorr
- Pterygota augouardii Pellegr.
- Pterygota bequaertii De Wild.
- Pterygota brasiliensis Allemão
- Pterygota bureavii Pierre
- Pterygota colombiana Cuatrec.
- Pterygota excelsa (Standl. & L.O.Williams) Kosterm.
- Pterygota forbesii F.Muell.
- Pterygota horsfieldii (R.Br.) Kosterm.
- Pterygota kamerunensis K.Schum. & Engl.
- Pterygota macrocarpa K.Schum.
- Pterygota madagascariensis Arènes
- Pterygota mildbraedii Engl.
- Pterygota papuana Warb.
- Pterygota perrieri Hochr.
- Pterygota schoorkopfii Engl.
- Pterygota schweinfurthii Engl.
- Pterygota thwaitesii (Mast.) Alston
- Pterygota trinervia K.Schum.
