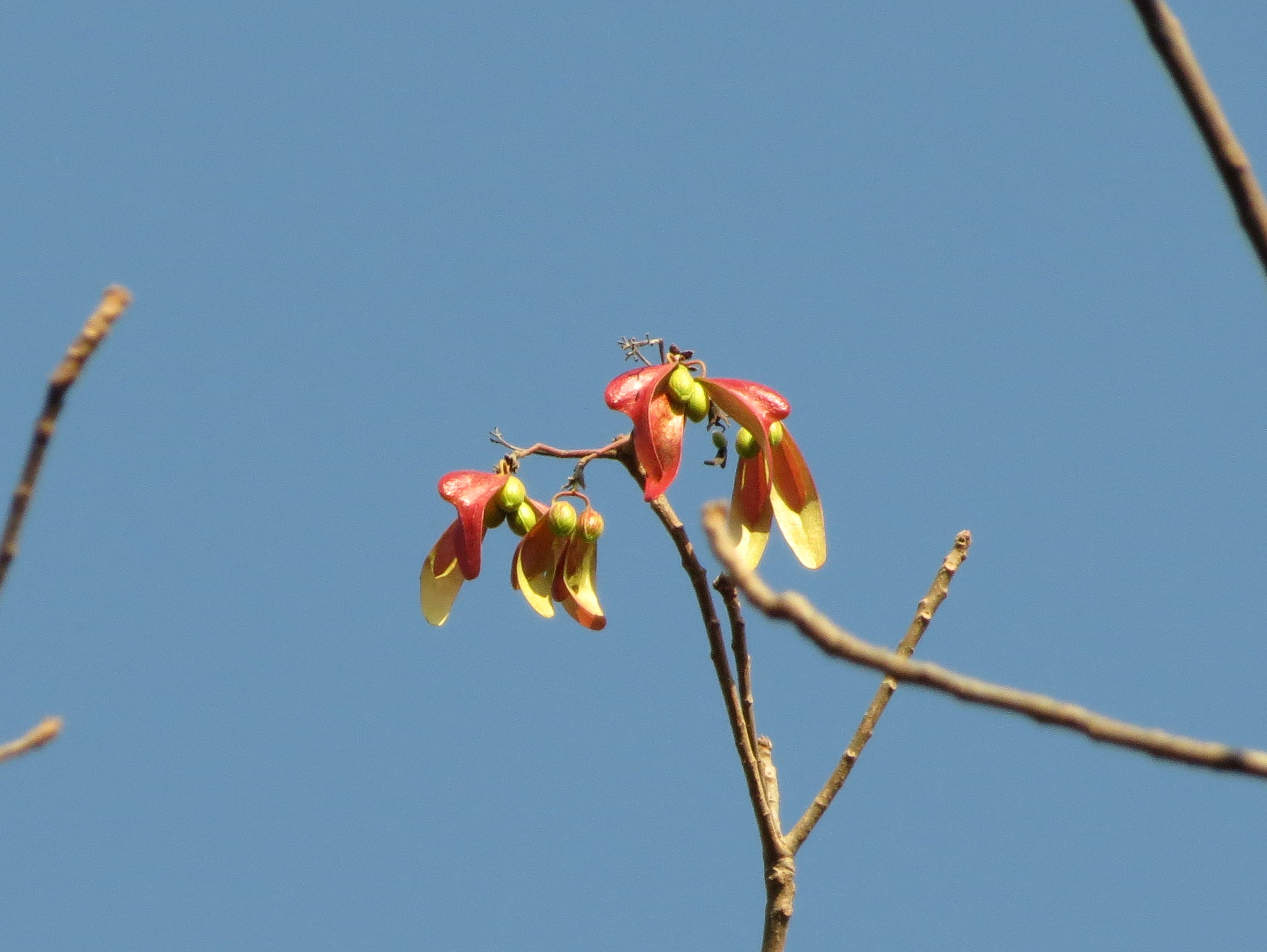
- Seeds of Pterocymbium tinctorium
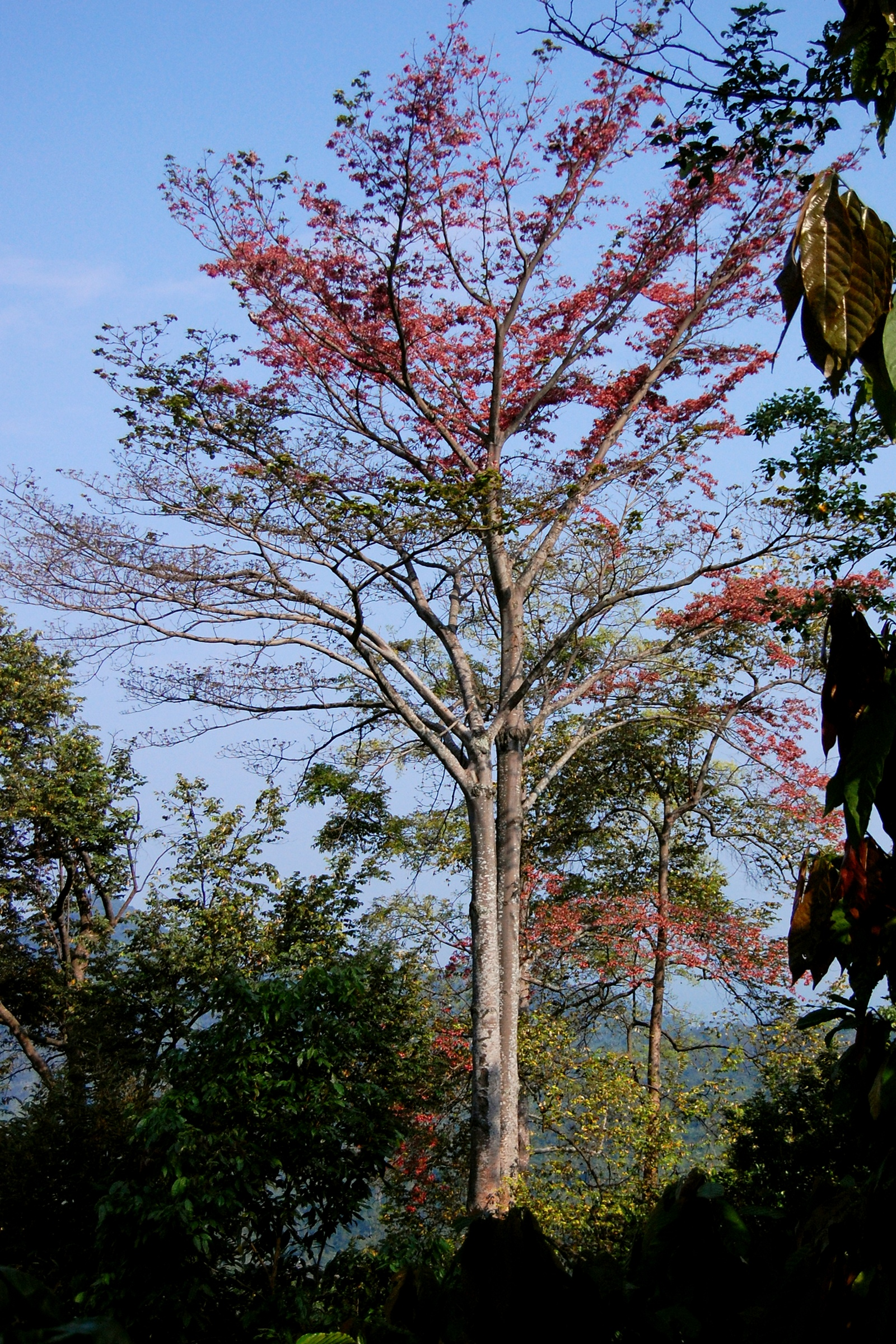
- P. tinctorium taken in Pesawaran Regency, Sumatra

Scientific classification
- Kingdom: Plantae
- Clade: Tracheophytes
- Clade: Angiosperms
- Clade: Eudicots
- Clade: Rosids
- Order: Malvales
- Family: Malvaceae
- Subfamily: Sterculioideae
- Genus: Pterocymbium; R.Br. (1844)

Species
- See text

= Pterocymbium =

Genus of plants

Pterocymbium is a genus in the family Malvaceae: in the subfamily Sterculioideae and previously placed in the Sterculiaceae. In Indonesia, P. tinctorium (Kelumbuk) is a significant timber tree.

== Species ==
Plants of the World Online currently (2025) accepts 12 species.

- Pterocymbium beccarii K.Schum. – New Guinea
- Pterocymbium dongnaiense Pierre – Laos and Vietnam^{§}
- Pterocymbium dussaudii Tardieu – Laos
- Pterocymbium macranthum Kosterm. – Thailand and Myanmar
- Pterocymbium micranthum Mildbr. – Bismarck Archipelago
- Pterocymbium oceanicum A.C.Sm. – Fiji
- Pterocymbium parviflorum Merr. – Borneo
- Pterocymbium splendens Kosterm. – Borneo
- Pterocymbium stipitatum C.T.White & W.D.Francis – New Guinea
- Pterocymbium tinctorium (Blanco) Merr. – Indo-China, Malesia (including Philippines)
- Pterocymbium tubulatum (Mast.) Pierre – Peninsular Malaysia
- Pterocymbium viridiflorum Teijsm. & Binn. ex Koord. – Sulawesi

^{§}In Viet Nam the name for this genus is Dực nang with two species listed:

- P. dongnaiense Pierre: Dực nang Ðồng nai
- P. tinctorium (Blanco) Merr.: Dực nang nhuộm

Both are deciduous trees, approximately 25 m high, found in tropical forests.
