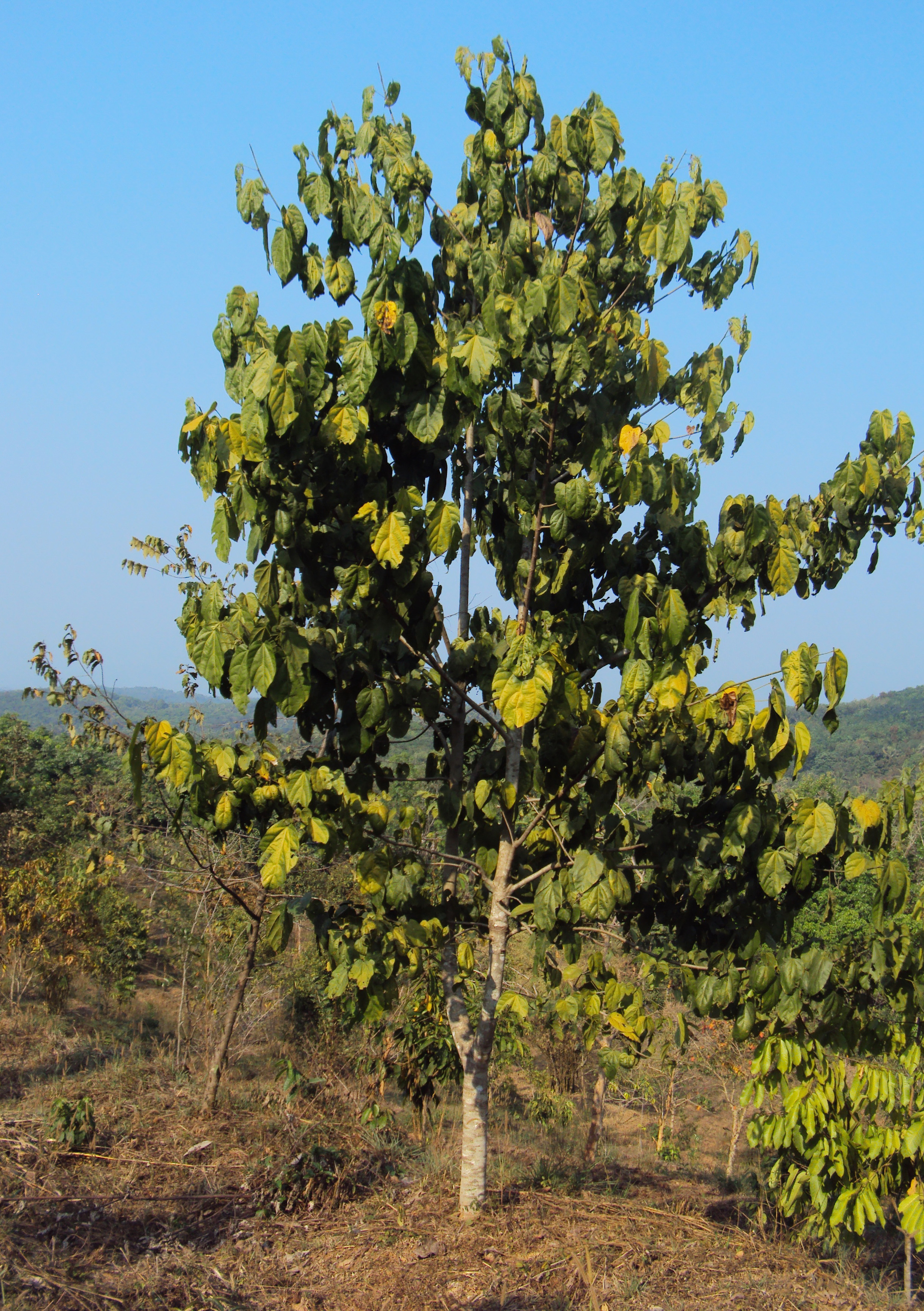

Scientific classification
- Kingdom: Plantae
- Clade: Tracheophytes
- Clade: Angiosperms
- Clade: Eudicots
- Clade: Rosids
- Order: Malvales
- Family: Malvaceae
- Genus: Pterygota
- Species: P. alata

Binomial name
- Pterygota alata (Roxb.) R.Br.

Synonyms
- Clompanus alata (Roxb.) Kuntze; Pterygota roxburghii Schott & Endl.; Sterculia alata Roxb.; Pterygota alata var. irregularis (W.W.Sm.) Deb & S.K.Basu; Sterculia alata var. irregularis W.W.Sm.; Sterculia coccinea Wall.; Sterculia haynei Bedd.

= Pterygota alata =

Species of plant

Pterygota alata is a species of large deciduous tree with winged seeds and large, simple leaves belonging to the family Malvaceae. It is commonly found in tropical and subtropical regions of South and Southeast Asia, particularly in India, Bangladesh, Myanmar, and Thailand.

== Description ==
Pterygota alata can grow up to 40 m (130 ft) in height, with a straight, cylindrical trunk that is often buttressed at the base. The bark is grayish-brown, smooth in younger trees, and develops fissures as the tree matures. Its large, simple, alternate leaves are broad and ovate, with a leathery texture and prominent veins.

The tree produces striking, reddish-brown polygamous flowers that are bell-shaped and arranged in clusters. These flowers lack petals but have conspicuous sepals and reproductive structures. The fruit is a large, woody, winged globose capsule, which splits open upon maturity to release up to 40 winged seeds adapted for wind dispersal.

== Habitat and distribution ==
This species thrives in tropical and subtropical moist forests, typically growing at low to mid elevations. It is commonly found in riverine forests and areas with well-drained, loamy soils. Due to its large size, Pterygota alata is often a dominant canopy tree in its natural habitat.

== Uses ==
The wood of Pterygota alata is lightweight and used for making furniture, plywood, packing materials, and boatbuilding. The tree is also valued for its ornamental appeal and is sometimes planted in parks and large gardens.

Additionally, its seeds are rich in oil, which can be used for industrial and medicinal purposes. In some cultures the edible seeds are used as a substitute for opium.

== Conservation status ==
Although not currently listed as endangered, Pterygota alata faces threats from deforestation and habitat loss due to logging and agricultural expansion. Conservation efforts focus on sustainable harvesting and reforestation programs in affected areas.

== Gallery ==
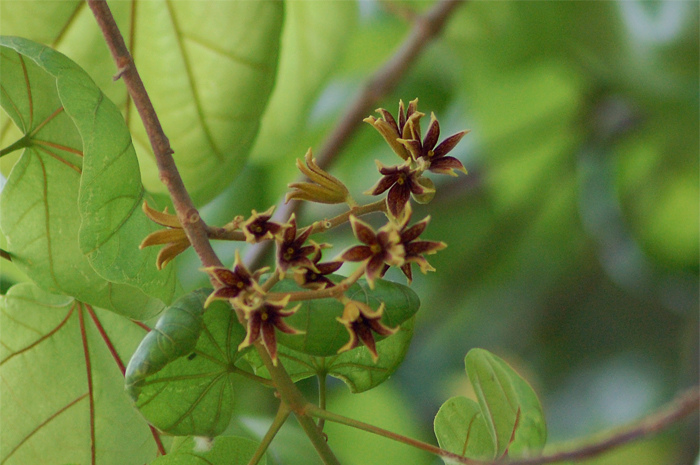
Flowers of the Pterygota alata tree

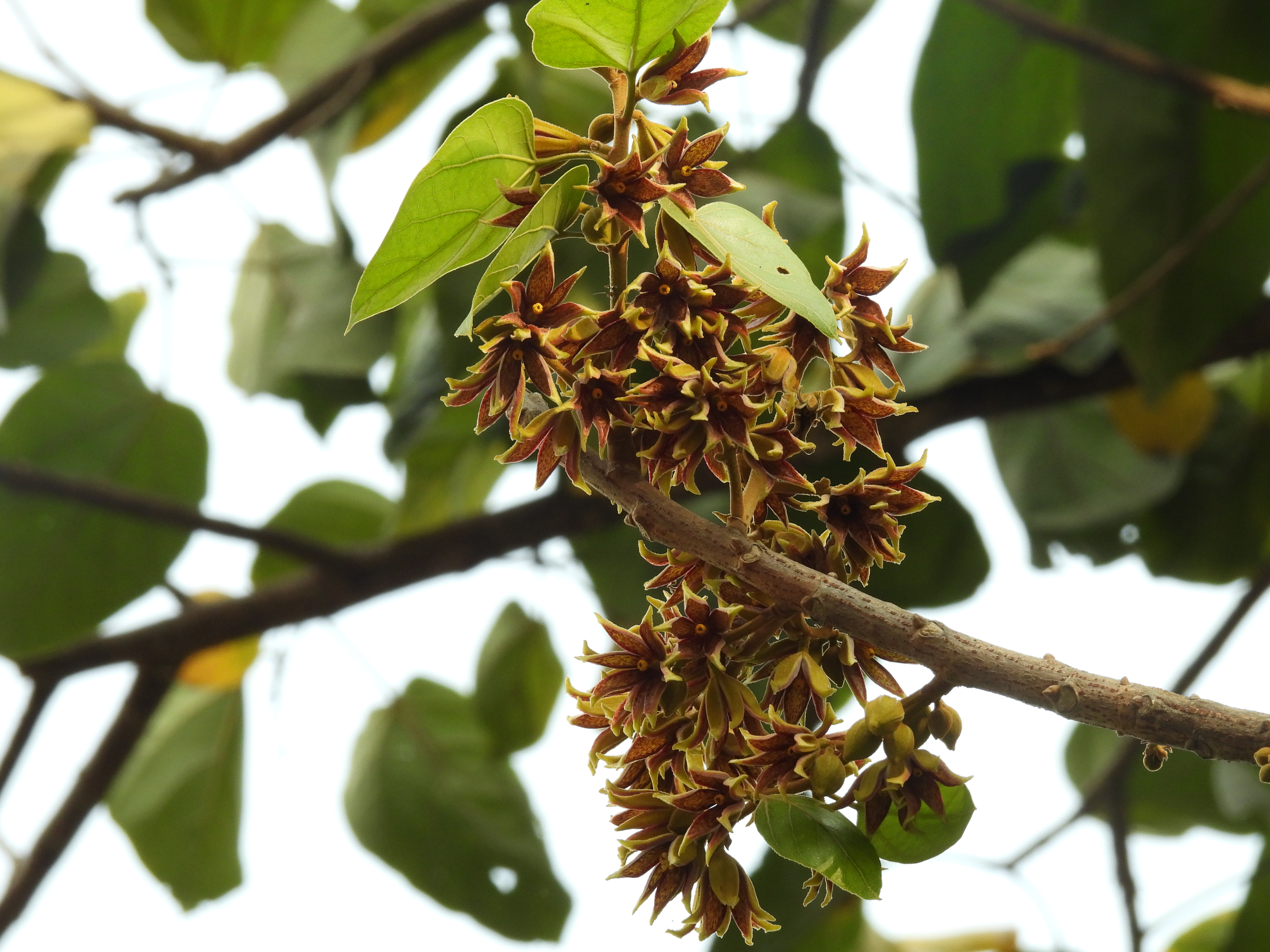
Inflorescence on a Pterygota Alata Tree

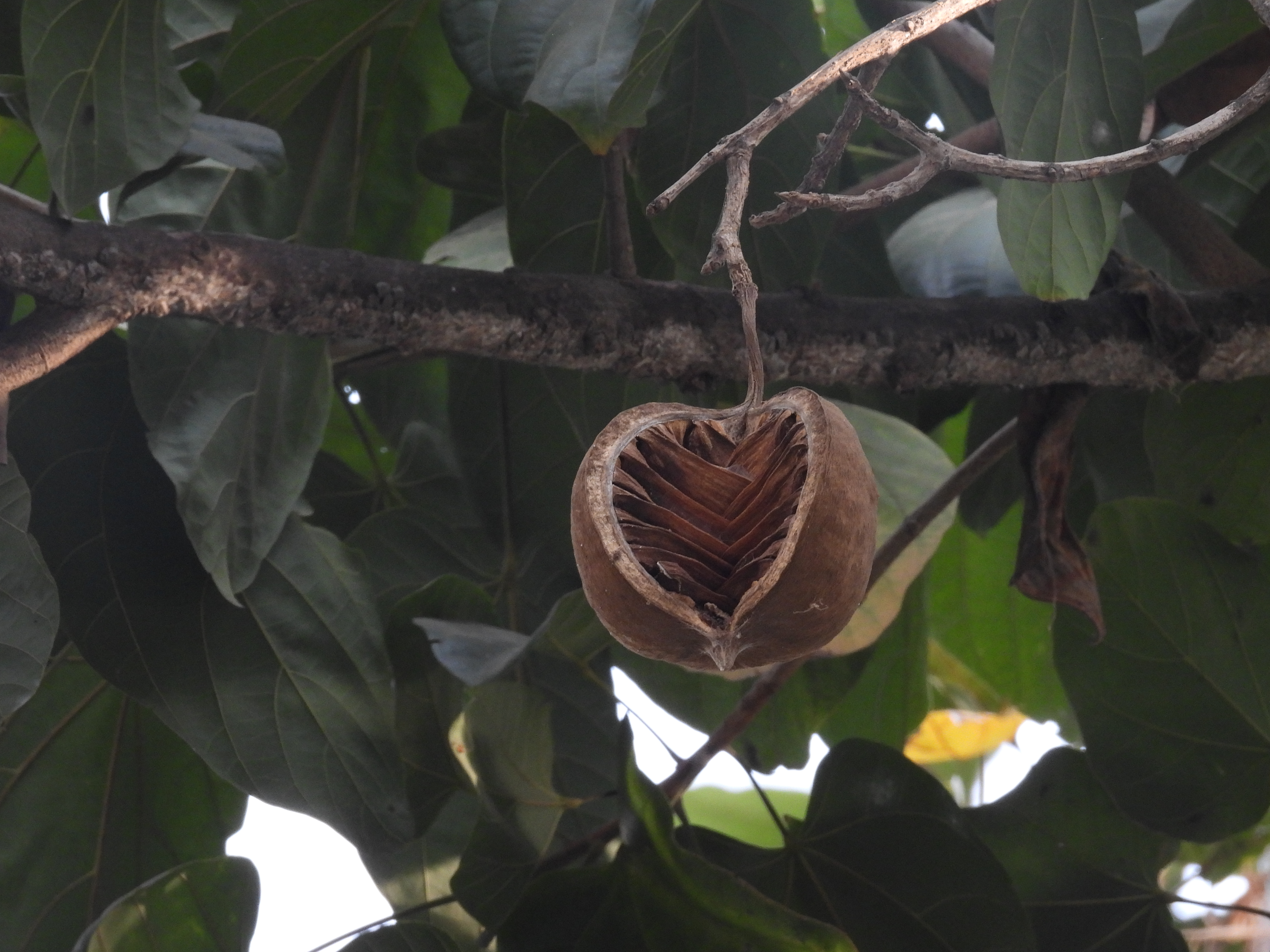
Winged seeds arranged in a pod of a Pterygota alata Tree

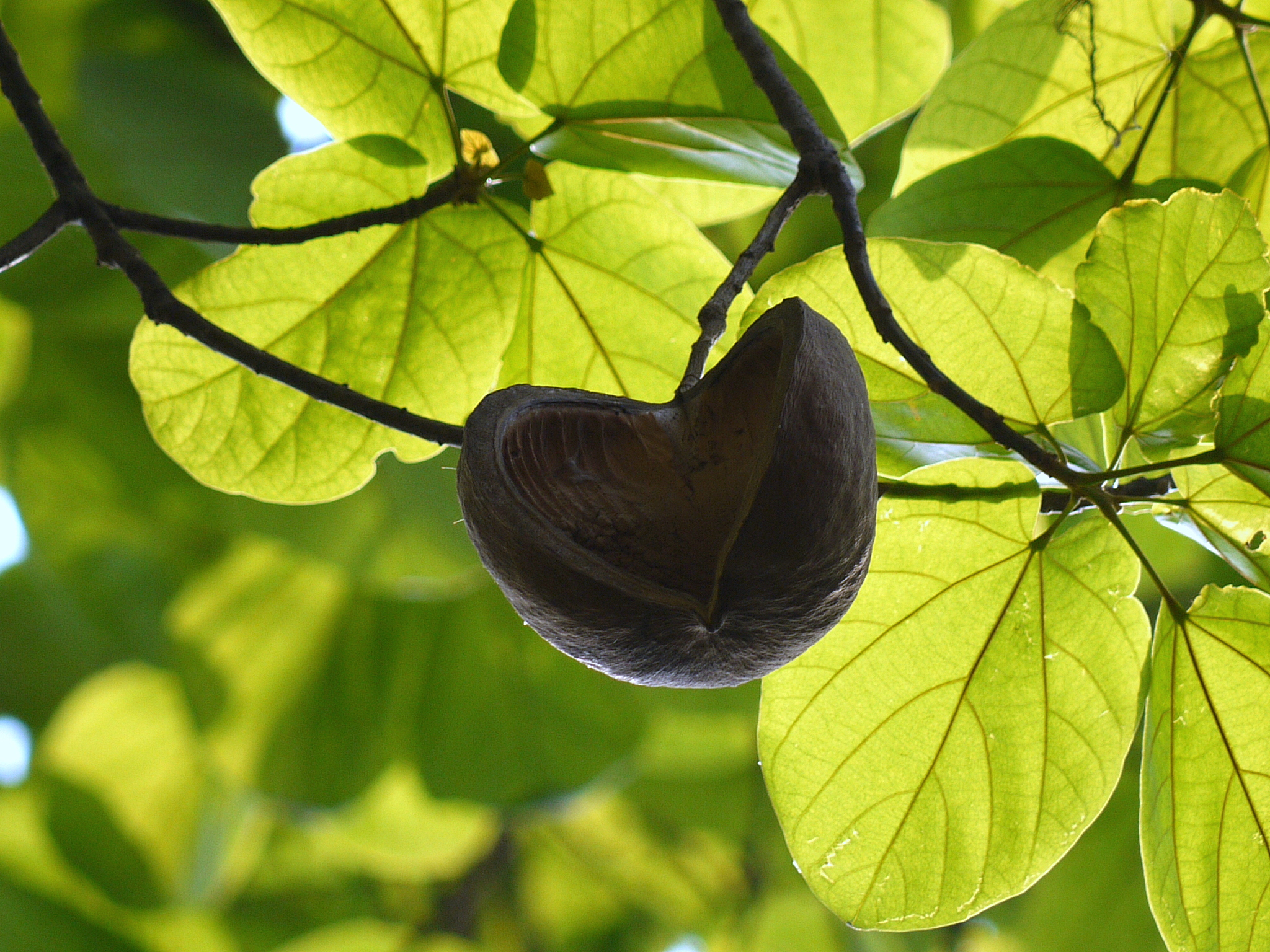
Empty seed pod of a Pterygota alata tree

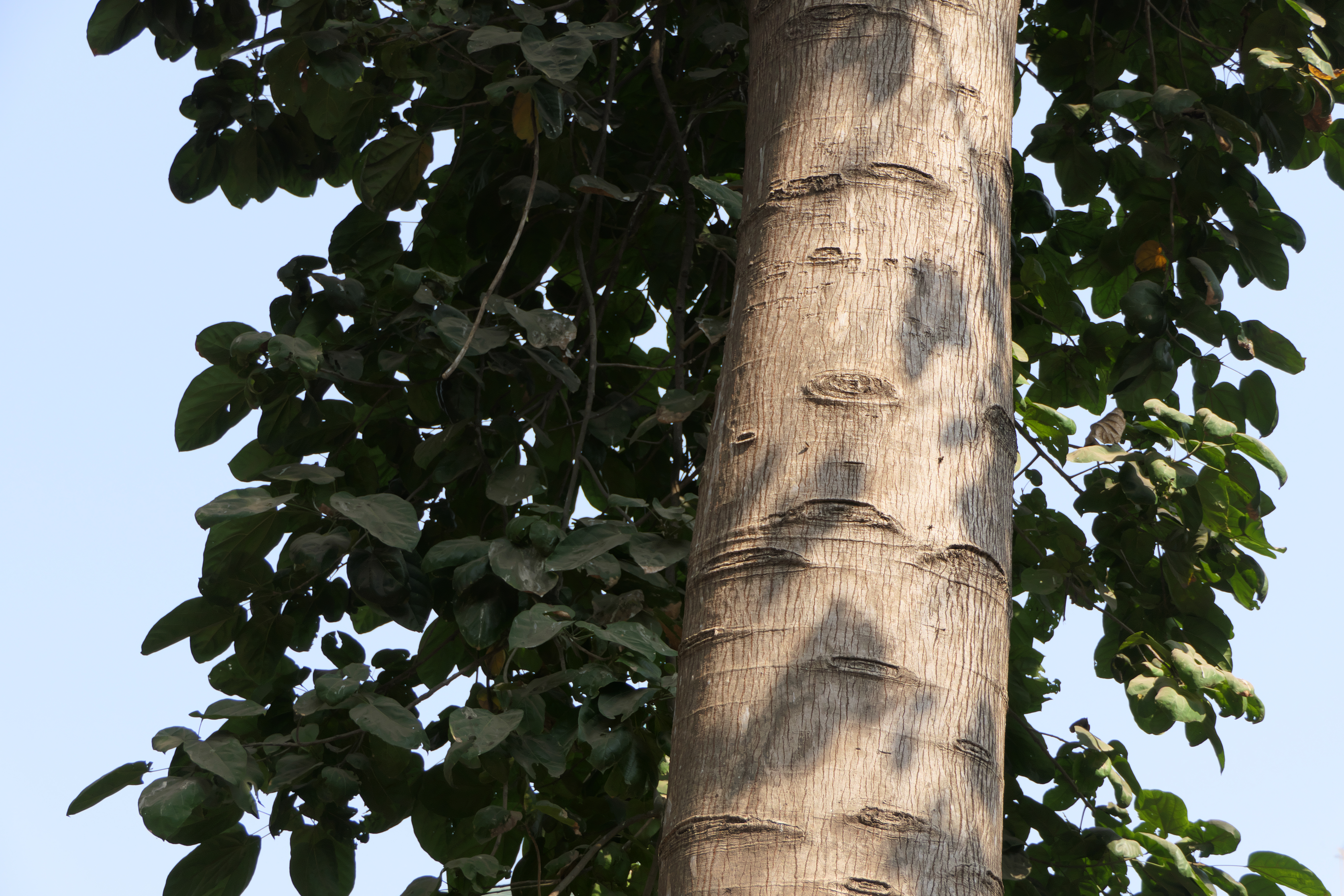
Light grey bark on Pterygota alata trunk

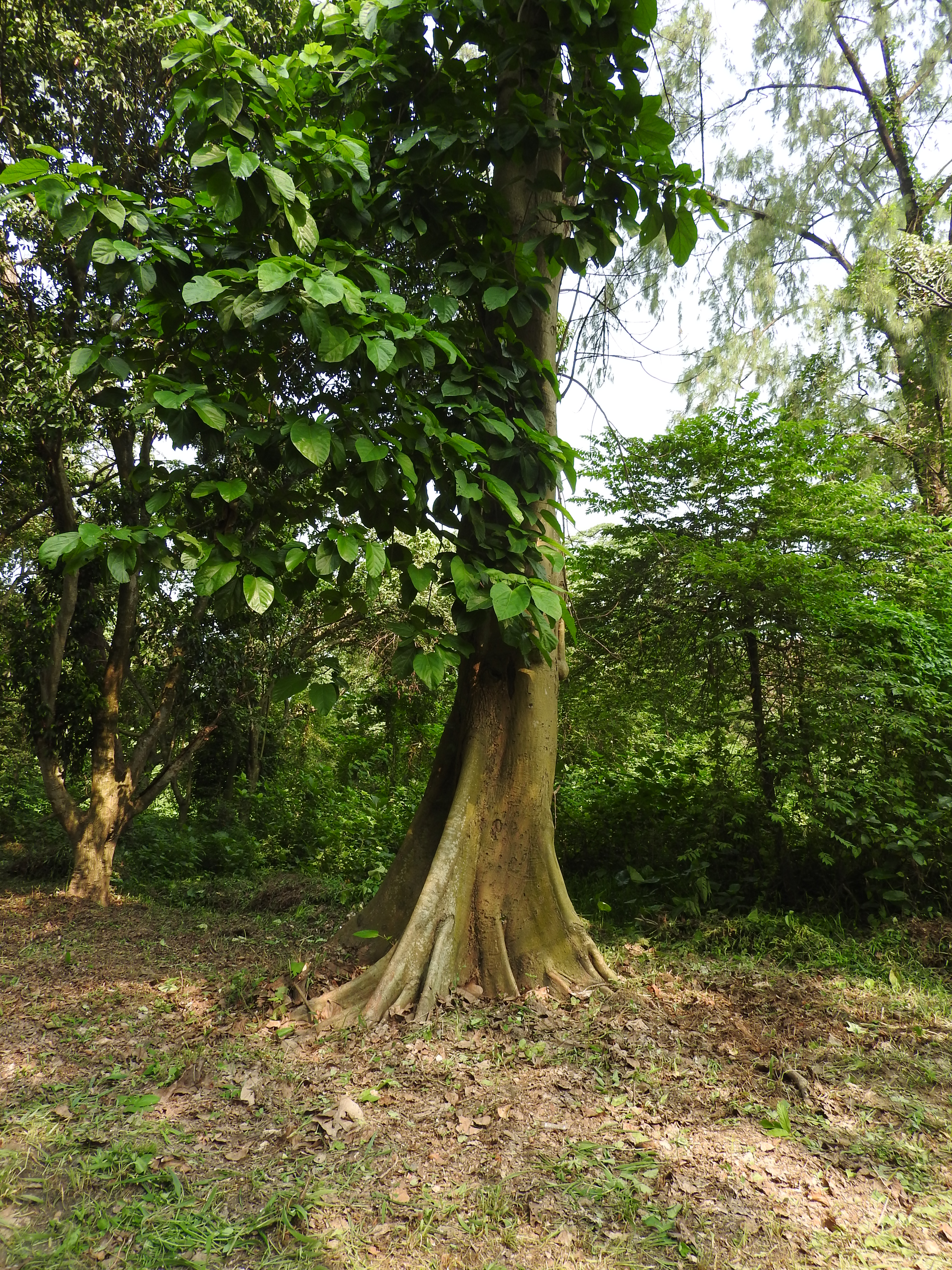
Buttress roots of Ptreygota alata
