= Franciscodendron =

Scientific classification
- Kingdom: Plantae
- Clade: Embryophytes
- Clade: Tracheophytes
- Clade: Angiosperms
- Clade: Eudicots
- Clade: Rosids
- Order: Malvales
- Family: Malvaceae
- Subfamily: Sterculioideae
- Genus: Franciscodendron; B.Hyland & Steenis
- Species: F. laurifolium

Binomial name
- Franciscodendron laurifolium (F.Muell.) B.Hyland & Steenis

Genus of trees

Franciscodendron is a monotypic genus in the subfamily Sterculioideae (previously the family Sterculiaceae) within the family Malvaceae. The single species, Franciscodendron laurifolium, commonly known as tulip sterculia, tulip kurrajong or cabbage crowsfoot, is a tree native to Australia.
