= Herbert L. Edlin =

British forester (1913–1976)

Herbert Leeson Edlin (29 January 1913 – 25 December 1976) known in publications as Herbert L. Edlin or Herbert Edlin, was a British botanist, forester and author.

== Life ==
Edlin was the fourth child and only son of Herbert Ebenezer and Nellie Edlin, née Leeson. His father was a doctor. After Manchester Grammar School, he obtained a Bachelor of Science from the University of Edinburgh in 1933 and a Diploma in Forestry from the University of Oxford in 1934. From 1935 to 1940 he worked as a tropical farmer on rubber plantations in British Malaya, gaining a working knowledge of Tamil. From 1940 to 1945 he was a district officer for the Forestry Commission in the New Forest. In June 1941 he married Margaret Pritchard. They had two sons. From 1945 to 1976 he was Press Officer for the Forestry Commission.

In addition to his duties with the Forestry Commission, from 1950 to 1976 he was an associate lecturer in nature conservation at the University of London. From 1974 to 1976 he was chairman of the South Eastern Division of the Royal Forestry Society and was, for a time, economics editor of the journal Forestry.

In April 1975, after the relocation of the Forestry Commission Headquarters to Edinburgh, Edlin continued his work on publications at Alice Holt Forest, commuting daily from his home in Coulsdon until his retirement from the Commission in August 1976.

In the Queen's Birthday Honours in 1970, Edlin was appointed Member of the Order of the British Empire (MBE).

== Works ==
- British Woodland Trees, Batsford, 1944, 3rd edition, 1949.
- Forestry and Woodland Life, Batsford, 1947.
- Woodland Crafts in Britain: An Account of the Traditional Uses of Trees and Timbers in the British Countryside, Batsford, 1949, 2nd edition, David & Charles, 1973.
- British Plants and Their Uses, Batsford, 1951.
- The Changing Wild Life of Britain, Batsford, 1952.
- The Forester's Handbook, Thames & Hudson, 1953.
- (With Maurice Nimmo) Tree Injuries: Their Causes and Their Prevention, Thames & Hudson, 1956.
- (With Nimmo) Treasury of Trees, Countrygoer Books, 1956.
- Trees, Woods and Man, Collins, 1956, 4th edition, 1974.
- England's Forests: A Survey of the Woodlands Old and New in the English and Welsh Counties, Faber, 1958.
- The Living Forest: A History of Trees and Timbers, Thames & Hudson, 1958.
- Wild Life of Wood and Forest, Hutchinson, 1960.
- Glamorgan Forests, foreword by Cennydd Traherne, H. M. Stationery Office (London, England), 1961.
- (Reviser) Edward Step, Wayside and Woodland Trees, Warne, 1964, revised edition published as Wayside and Woodland Trees: A Guide to the Trees of Britain and Ireland, 1964.
- Forestry in Great Britain: A Review of Progress to 1964, Forestry Commission (London, England), 1964.
- Know Your Conifers, H.M.S.O., 1965, 2nd edition, 1970.
- Forestry, Hale (London, England), 1966.
- Collins Guide to Tree Planting and Cultivation, Collins (London, England), 1970.
- Forestry, R. Hale, 1966.
- Man and Plants, Aldus Books, 1967, published as Plants and Man: The Story of Our Basic Food, Natural History Press, 1969.
- Know Your Broadleaves, H.M.S.O., 1968.
- Timber! Your Growing Investment, H.M.S.O., 1969.
- Forests of Central and Southern Scotland, H.M.S.O., 1969.
- What Wood Is That: A Manual of Wood Identification, Viking, 1969; new edition, Stobart, 1977.
- Collins Guide to Tree Planting and Cultivation, Collins, 1970, 3rd edition, 1975.
- The Public Park, Routledge & Kegan Paul, 1971.
- (With Anthony Huxley) Atlas of Plant Life, John Day, 1973.
- Trees and Timbers, Routledge & Kegan Paul, 1973.
- (With Nimmo) The World of Trees, Bounty Books, 1974.
- The Observer's Book of Trees, Warne, 1975, Scribner, 1979.
- Forests of North-East Scotland, H.M.S.O., 1976, 2nd edition, 1978.
- Trees and Man, Columbia University Press, 1976 (published in England as The Natural History of Trees, Weidenfeld & Nicolson, 1976).
- (Compiler and contributor) The Tree Key: A Guide to Identification in Garden, Field, and Forest, Scribner, 1978.
- (With Nimmo and others) The Illustrated Encyclopedia of Trees, Timbers and Forests of the World, Harmony Books, 1978.

Editor; all published by H.M.S.O. for Forestry Commission of Great Britain:

- Guide to the Argyll National Forest Park, 1938, 5th edition published as Argyll Forest Park, 1976.
- Hardknott, 1949.
- The Queen Elizabeth Forest Park Guide, 1954, 2nd edition published as Queen Elizabeth Forest Park: Ben Lomond, Loch Ard and the Trossachs, 1973.
- Dean Forest and Wye Valley, 2nd edition, 1956, 4th edition, 1974.
- Cambrian Forests, 1959, 2nd edition, 1975.
- Glen Trool, 1959, 3rd edition, 1965.
- Glamorgan Forests, 1961.
- Snowdonia, 3rd edition, 1963, 4th edition, 1969.
- New Forest, 2nd edition, 1961, 4th edition, 1969.
- North Yorkshire Forests, 1963, 3rd edition, 1972.
- Forestry Practice: A Summary of Methods of Establishing Forest Nurseries and Plantations with Advice on Other Forestry Questions for Owners, Agents, and Foresters, 8th edition, 1964.
- East Anglian Forests, 1972.
- Atlas of Plant Life, illustrated by David Nockels and Henry Barnett, Heinemann (London, England), 1973.
- Galloway Forest Park, 4th edition, 1974.

Also author of numerous pamphlets and park guides, including Forestry, Pilot Press, 1947, Forest Parks, H.M.S.O., 1961, 2nd edition, 1969, Short Guide to Snowdonia National Forest Park, H.M.S.O., 1962, Short Guide to the Dean and Wye Valley Forest Park, H.M.S.O., 1963, Forestry in Great Britain: A Review of Progress to 1964, H.M.S.O., 1964, Checklist of Forestry Commission Publications, 1919-65, H.M.S.O., 1966, and Forestry in Great Britain: A Review of Progress to 1973, Great Britain Forestry Commission, 1973. Contributor to Encyclopaedia Britannica. Also contributor to journals, including Forestry, Quarterly Journal of Forestry, Scottish Forestry, Commonwealth Forestry Review, and The Young Farmer.

== General References ==
- Grant, John: Who’s Who of British Scientists 1971–72, Prentice Hall Press, 1971, ISBN 0-582-11464-0, p. 260
- Desmond, Ray: Dictionary of British and Irish Botanists and Horticulturalists: Including Plant Collectors, Flower Painters and Garden Designers Taylor & Francis Ltd., 2nd Endition, 1994, ISBN 0-85066-843-3, pp. 226–227
