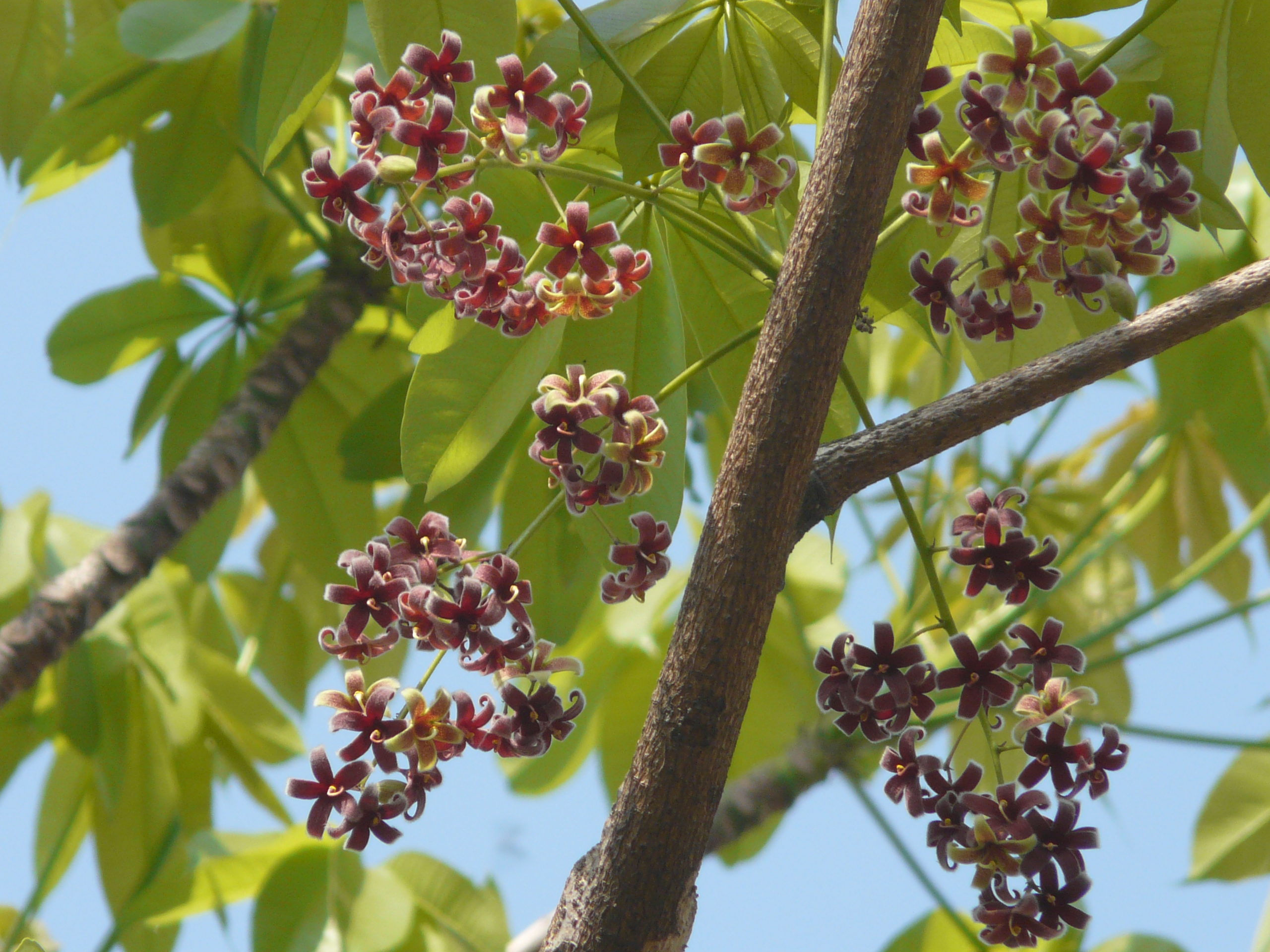
- Sterculia foetida

Scientific classification
- Kingdom: Plantae
- Clade: Tracheophytes
- Clade: Angiosperms
- Clade: Eudicots
- Clade: Rosids
- Order: Malvales
- Family: Malvaceae
- Subfamily: Sterculioideae; Beilschm.

Type genus
- Sterculia L.

Genera
- See below

Synonyms
- †Florissantoideae; Coloideae

= Sterculioideae =

Subfamily of trees and shrubs

Sterculioideae is a subfamily of the family Malvaceae containing evergreen and deciduous tree and shrub genera, that were previously placed in the obsolete family Sterculiaceae.

== Taxonomy ==
A 2006 molecular study indicated the Sterculioideae was most likely to be a monophyletic group, and that it had four major clades within it. However, the relationships between the clades were not resolved.

The clades consist of:

- a Cola clade, with the genera Cola and Octolobus of Africa and Pterygota of Africa, South America and southeast Asia forming a subclade, Hildegardia and Firmiana forming a second and Scaphium and Pterocymbium a third.
- Heritiera clade comprising the genus Heritiera
- Sterculia clade comprising the large genus Sterculia of Australasia and Asia.
- Brachychiton clade of Australasian and New Caledonian species, including Brachychiton, Acropogon, Argyrodendron and Franciscodendron.

=== List of genera ===
- Acropogon Schltr.
- Argyrodendron F.Muell.
- Brachychiton Schott & Endl.
- Cola Schott & Endl.
- Firmiana Marsili
- Franciscodendron B.Hyland & Steenis
- Heritiera Aiton
- Hildegardia Schott & Endl.
- Octolobus Welw.
- Pterocymbium R.Br.
- Pterygota Schott & Endl.
- Scaphium Schott & Endl.
- Sterculia L.
- †Florissantia (Knowlton) Manchester
