= Selma, Kansas =

Unincorporated community in Anderson County, Kansas

- Unincorporated community
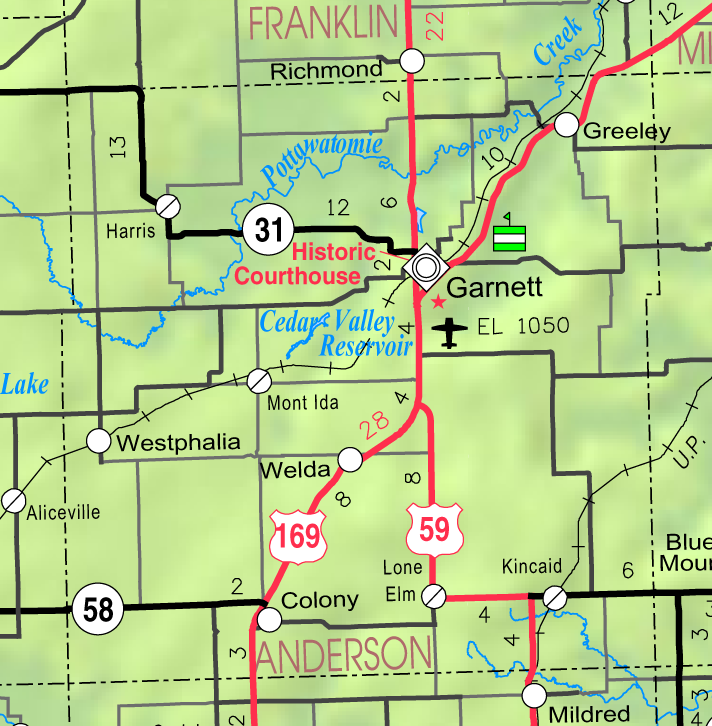
- KDOT map of Anderson County (legend)

- Location within Kansas Location within the United States
- Coordinates: 38°08′05″N 95°07′24″W
- Country: United States
- State: Kansas
- County: Anderson
- Elevation: 1,063 ft (324 m)
- Time zone: UTC-6 (CST)
  - Summer (DST): UTC-5 (CDT)
- FIPS code: 20-63925
- GNIS ID: 477894

Selma is an unincorporated community in Rich Township, Anderson County, Kansas, United States. It is located approximately four miles north-northeast of Kincaid next to the Union Pacific Railroad (formerly the Missouri-Kansas-Texas).

== History ==
A post office was opened in Selma in 1887, and remained in operation until it was discontinued in 1956. At one time, Selma had a one-room elementary school, two churches (Christian and Methodist), a blacksmith shop, a hotel, a general store, a drug store, a lumber yard, service station, and other small businesses. The town even had a physician for a short time. The town had two newspapers in its history, The Telephone (published April 1895-March 1896) and The Selma News-Herald (1965–1968).

Selma was established at the junction of the Kansas, Nebraska and Dakota and the Missouri-Kansas-Texas Railroads in 1887. The town initially had two names, as the KN&D named its depot "Trilby," but the MKT named the location "Selma." The latter became the permanent name for the town (the KN&D discontinued its operations in 1934). The MKT maintained its depot until sometime during the 1940s. Selma was once a livestock loading point on the Katy's Kansas City to Parsons line, which was purchased by the Union Pacific in 1988. The line is still active today.

Although the town lost its business district over the years, two symbols of the community remained: the Methodist Church and the School (which served as a community center after Selma Elementary School was closed and consolidated with the elementary school in Kincaid in 1964). The community had an active 4-H club and church organizations. The Methodist Church remained the central point for the community until 2001 when the declining number of parishioners forced a consolidation of the Selma church with its counterpart in nearby Kincaid. The consolidated congregation built a new church in Kincaid, and, with no need for separate facilities, the original church buildings in each community were torn down.

Today, only a handful of people live in Selma. The century-old school building, originally built in 1921, still stands.
