= Glenloch =

Glenloch may refer to:

- Glenloch, Georgia, an unincorporated community
- Glenloch, Peachtree City, Georgia, a village in Peachtree City
- Glenloch, Pennsylvania, an unincorporated community in Chester County
- Glenloch Interchange, a road junction in Canberra, ACT
- Glenlock, Kansas, formerly spelled Glenloch, an unincorporated community in Anderson County
