= 1855 Kansas Territory elections =

The 1855 Kansas Territory elections were a series of pivotal moments in the "Bleeding Kansas" conflict between pro-slavery individuals and "Free-Staters" in Kansas Territory. The initial elections for territorial legislature, held on March 30, 1855, were marred by widespread voter fraud, intimidation, and violence, as pro-slavery forces from neighboring Missouri crossed the border to cast ballots and suppress anti-slavery voters. In response, Kansas Territorial governor, Andrew H. Reeder, ordered new elections to be held on May 22 in certain districts. But even after the corrective elections, pro-slavery candidates still managed to win a majority of seats in the territorial legislature. When the legislature convened in July, it promptly ejected all the Free-State candidates who had won seats in the May elections. This act led to many Kansans lambasting the body as the "Bogus Legislature."

In October 1855, elections were held for a Congressional delegate to represent Kansas Territory in the House of Representatives. Pro-slavers held their elections on October 1 and choose John Wilkins Whitfield, whereas Free-Staters held theirs on October 8 and selected Reeder. Whitfield was initially seated as the lawful delegate, but after Reeder petitioned the House, the seat was vacated on August 1, 1856 and a new election was ordered.

== Territorial legislature election results ==
=== Territorial Council results ===
1855 Council elections in Kansas Territory
- March 30, 1855; May 22, 1855

All 13 seats to the Kansas Territory Council
	Majority party	Minority party
Party	Pro-slavery	Free-State
Seats won	10	3 (Note: Martin F. Conway (a Free-State councilman who was elected in March 1855), never took his seat. In July 1855, Jesse D. Wood and John A. Wakefield (who had been elected in the corrective May election) were unseated by the pro-slavery majority and their positions were filled by Andrew McDonald and Hiram J. Strickler.)

Summary of the 1855 Kansas Territory Council election results
Faction	March 30 elections	May 22 elections	Total seats
Pro-slavery	10	0	10
Free-State	1	2	3
Source: Andreas, Alfred T. (1883). History of the State of Kansas. Chicago: A. T. Andreas. pp. 95–101.

==== March 30 election results ====
Council District 1
Faction	Candidates	Votes	%
Pro-slavery	Thomas Johnson; Edward Chapman	900 (Note: While this number is present in Andreas (1883), it is not explicitly given in the House's report. It can be derived by adding the total votes for Johnson/Chapman from the first (780 votes), fourth (78 votes), and seventeenth (42 votes) election districts.)	79.08
Free-State	Joel K. Goodwin; Samuel Newitt Wood	273	23.08
–	"Scattering" votes	10	0.84
Total votes cast		1,183	
Illegally cast		827	69.91
Pro-slavery gain			

Council District 2
Faction	Candidate	Votes	%
Pro-slavery	A. McDonald	318	96.36
Free-State	J. A. Wakefield	12	3.64
Total votes cast		330	
Illegally cast		316	95.76
Results abrogated; new election ordered			

Council District 3
Faction	Candidate	Votes	%
Pro-slavery	H. S. Strickler	598	92.71
Free-State	William F. Johnson	23	3.56
Free-State	— Rice	17	2.64
Free-State	A. McDonald	4	0.62
–	"Scattering" votes	3	0.46
Total votes cast		645 (Note: This is the total number of votes cast in the third (374 votes), seventh (234 votes), and eighth (37 votes) election districts. Andreas (1883) correctly gives the total as 645 whereas the total is miscalculated as 642 in the House's report.)	
Illegally cast		547	84.81
Results abrogated; new election ordered			

Council District 4
Faction	Candidates	Votes	%
Pro-slavery	A. M. Coffee; David Lykins	680	79.53
Free-State	M. G. Morris; James P. Fox	158	18.47
–	"Scattering" votes	17	1.99
Total votes cast		855	
Illegally cast		630	73.68
Pro-slavery gain			

Council District 5
Faction	Candidate	Votes	%
Pro-slavery	William Barbee	343	100
Total votes cast		343	
Illegally cast		243	70.84
Pro-slavery gain			

Council District 6
Faction	Candidate	Votes	%
Free-State	Martin F. Conway	139 (Note: According to initial returns, Donaldson received 395 and Conway received 142. However, Gov. Reeder later disqualified all the results from the 11th Election District because the vote there had been held viva voce instead of by ballot (as required by law). The rejection of these results cost Donaldson 328 votes and Conway 3, swinging the election in Conway's favor.)	66.51
Pro-slavery	John Donaldson	68	32.54
–	"Scattering" votes	2	0.96
Total votes cast (Election Districts 9-12)		540 (Note: This is the total number of votes cast in the ninth (75 votes), tenth (92 votes), eleventh (331 votes), and twelfth (42 votes) election districts. Andreas (1883) correctly gives the total as 540, whereas the total is miscalculated as 538 in the House's report.)	
Total votes cast (Election Districts 9-10, 12)		209 (Note: This is the total number of votes cast in the ninth (75 votes), tenth (92 votes), and twelfth (42 votes) election districts.)	
Illegally cast (Election Districts 9-12)		345 (Note: This is the total number of illegal votes cast in the ninth, tenth, eleventh, and twelfth election districts.)	63.89
Illegally cast (Election Districts 9-10, 12)		21 (Note: This is the total number of illegal votes cast in only the ninth, tenth, and twelfth election districts.)	10.04
Free-State gain			

Council District 7
Faction	Candidate	Votes	%
Pro-slavery	John W. Foreman	478	100
Total votes cast		478	
Illegally cast		207	43.30
Pro-slavery gain			

Council District 8
Faction	Candidate	Votes	%
Pro-slavery	W. P. Richardson	234	77.48
Free-State	John W. Whitehead	68	22.52
Total votes cast		302	
Illegally cast		166	55.00
Pro-slavery gain			

Council District 9
Faction	Candidate	Votes	%
Pro-slavery	D. A. M. Grover	411	99.76
–	"Scattering" votes	1	0.24
Total votes cast		412	
Illegally cast		332	80.58
Pro-slavery gain			

Council District 10
Faction	Candidates	Votes	%
Pro-slavery	R. R. Rees; J. J. Eastin	1,129	94.48
Free-State	B. H. Twombly; A. J. Whitney	66 (Note: This is the total number of votes cast in the thirteenth (6 votes) and sixteenth (60 votes) election districts for both Twombly and Whitney. Andreas (1883) correctly gives the total as 66 whereas the total is miscalculated as 166 in the House's report.)	5.52
Total votes cast		1,195 (Note: This is the total number of votes cast for Rees/Eastin in the thirteenth (233 votes) and sixteenth (896 votes) election districts, combined with the total number of votes cast for Twombly/Whitney in the thirteenth (6 votes) and sixteenth (60 votes) election districts. Andreas (1883) correctly gives the total as 1,195, whereas the total is miscalculated as 1,206 in the House's report.)	
Illegally cast		1,044 (Note: This is the total number of illegal votes cast in the thirteenth (230 votes) and sixteenth (814) election districts. Andreas (1883) erroneously gives the total as 1,033.)	86.57
Pro-slavery gain			

==== May 22 election results ====
Council District 2
Faction	Candidate	Votes	%
Free-State	J. A. Wakefield	127	100
Total votes cast		127	
Free-State gain			

Council District 3
Faction	Candidate	Votes	%
Free-State	Jesse D. Wood	214	86.64
Free-State	C. H. Washington	33	13.36
–	"Scattering" votes	14	0.84
Total votes cast		247	
Free-State gain			

=== Territorial House results ===
1855 House of Representatives elections in Kansas Territory
- March 30, 1855; May 22, 1855

All 26 seats to the Kansas Territory House of Representatives
	Majority party	Minority party
Party	Pro-slavery	Free-State
Seats won	18	8 (Note: In July 1855, John Hutchison, Erastus. D. Ladd, Philip P. Fowler, Augustus Wattles, William Jessee, and Cyrus K. Holliday (Free-Staters who had been elected in the corrective May election), as well as A. J. Baker (a Free-Stater who had been elected in the March elections by a technicality) were unseated by the pro-slavery majority and their positions were filled by James Whitlock, John M. Banks, A. B. Wade, G. W. Ward, O. H. Brown, D. L. Croysdale, and M. W. McGee (all of whom were pro-slavery in alignment). The remaining Free-State representative, S. D. Houston, would resign in protest on July 23.)

Summary of the 1855 Kansas Territory House of Representatives election results
Faction	March 30 elections	May 22 elections	Total seats
Pro-slavery	15	3	18
Free-State	2	6	8
Source: Andreas, Alfred T. (1883). History of the State of Kansas. Chicago: A. T. Andreas. pp. 95–101.

==== March 30 election results ====
House District 1
Faction	Candidate	Votes	%
Pro-slavery	A. S. Johnson	120	84.51
Free-State	A. F. Powell	19	13.38
–	"Scattering" votes	3	2.11
Total votes cast		142 (Note: This is the total number of votes for Johnson (120 votes), Powell (19 votes), and any scattering votes (3). Andreas (1883) correctly gives the total as 142, whereas the total is miscalculated as 139 in the House's report.)	
Illegally cast		65 (Note: Andreas (1883) has the number as 68.)	45.77
Pro-slavery gain			

House District 2
Faction	Candidates	Votes	%
Pro-slavery	Jatues Whitlock; J. M. Banks; A. B. Wade	781	74.81
Free-State	John Hutchison; E. D. Ladd; P. P. Fowler	253	24.23
–	"Scattering" votes	10	0.96
Total votes cast		1,044 (Note: This is the total number of votes for Whitlock/Banks/Wade (781 votes), Hutchison/Ladd/Fowler (253 votes), and any scattering votes (10). Andreas (1883) correctly gives the total as 1,044, whereas the total is miscalculated as 1,034 in the House's report.)	
Illegally cast		802 (Note: Andreas (1883) has the number as 812.)	76.82
Results abrogated; new election ordered			

House District 3
Faction	Candidates	Votes	%
Pro-slavery	G. W. Ward; O. H. Brown	318	93.26
Free-State	Isaac Davis; E. G. Macy	12	3.52
–	"Scattering" votes	11	3.23
Total votes cast		341	
Illegally cast		316	31.09
Results abrogated; new election ordered			

House District 4
Faction	Candidate	Votes	%
Pro-slavery	D. L. Croysdale	366	98.65
Free-State	Cyrus K. Holliday	4	1.08
–	"Scattering" votes	1	0.27
Total votes cast		371 (Note: This is the total number of votes for Croysdale (366 votes), Holliday (4 votes), and any scattering votes (1). Andreas (1883) correctly gives the total as 371, whereas the total is miscalculated as 370 in the House's report.)	
Illegally cast		338 (Note: Andreas (1883) has the number as 308.)	91.11
Results abrogated; new election ordered			

House District 5
Faction	Candidates	Votes	%
Free-State	A. J. Baker	25 (Note: According to initial returns, McGee received 222 votes (210 of which were from seventh election district), Baker received 26 (1 of which was in the seventh election district), and H. Rice received 23 (all from the seventh election district). However, Gov. Reeder later disqualified all the results from the 7th Election District because the judges overseeing the vote had not been sworn in. The rejection of these results cost McGee 210 votes, Baker 1 vote, and Rice all of his votes. This swung the election in Baker's favor.)	64.10
Pro-slavery	M. W. McGee	12	30.77
Free-State	H. Rice	0	0
–	"Scattering" votes	2	5.13
Total votes cast (Election Districts 7–8)		273 (Note: This number is the sum of the votes cast in the seventh (234 votes) and eighth (37 votes) election districts plus two scattering votes reported by Andreas.)	
Total votes cast (Election District 8 only)		39 (Note: This number is the sum of the votes cast in the eighth (37 votes) election districts plus two scattering votes reported by Andreas.)	
Illegally cast (Election Districts 7–8)		209 (Note: Andreas (1883) has the number as 211.)	76.56
Free-State gain			

House District 6
Faction	Candidates	Votes	%
Pro-slavery	Joseph C. Anderson; S. A. Williams	315	90.0
Free-State	John Hamilton; William Margraves	35	10.0
Total votes cast		350	
Illegally cast		250	71.43
Pro-slavery gain			

House District 7
Faction	Candidates	Votes	%
Pro-slavery	W. A. Haskall; A. Wilkinson; H. Younger; Samuel Scott	684	80.19
Free-State	John Serpell; Adam Pore; S. H. Houser; William Jennings	152	17.82
–	"Scattering" votes	17	1.99
Total votes cast		853 (Note: This is the total number of votes for Haskall et al. (684 votes), Serpell et al. (152 votes), and 17 scattering votes. Andreas (1883) correctly gives the total as 853, whereas the total is miscalculated as 855 in the House's report.)	
Illegally cast		630 (Note: Andreas (1883) has the number as 629.)	
Pro-slavery gain			

House District 8
Faction	Candidate	Votes	%
Free-State	S. D. Houston	120	71.86
Pro-slavery	Russell Garrett	41	24.55
–	"Scattering" votes	6	3.59
Total votes cast		167	
Illegally cast		10 (Note: Andreas (1883) has the number as 11.)	5.99
Free-State gain			

House District 9
Faction	Candidate	Votes	%
Pro-slavery	J. Marshall	344	91.98
Free-State	H. McCartney	26	6.95
–	"Scattering" votes	4	1.07
Total votes cast		374 (Note: This is the total number of votes for Marshall (344 votes), McCartney (26 votes), and 4 scattering votes. Andreas (1883) correctly gives the total as 374, whereas the total is miscalculated as 370 in the House's report.)	
Illegally cast		321	85.83
Pro-slavery gain			

House District 10
Faction	Candidate	Votes	%
Pro-slavery	William H. Tibbs	237	98.75
Free-State	C. Hard	3	1.25
Total votes cast		240 (Note: This is the total number of votes for Tibbs (237 votes) and Hard (3 votes). Andreas (1883) correctly gives the total as 240, whereas the total is miscalculated as 242 in the House's report.)	
Illegally cast		230 (Note: Andreas (1883) has the number as 228.)	95.83
Pro-slavery gain			

House District 11 (Note: Unless otherwise noted, these results are based exclusively on Andreas (1883), due to a typesetting error rendering page 33 of the House's report unworkable.)
Faction	Candidates	Votes	%
Pro-slavery	J. H. Stringfellow; R. L. Kirk	420	87.5
Free-State	G. A. Cutler; John Landis	54	11.25
–	"Scattering" votes	6	1.25
Total votes cast		480	
Illegally cast		–	–
Pro-slavery gain			

House District 12
Faction	Candidates	Votes	%
Pro-slavery	J. P. Blair; T. W. Watterson	258	99.23
Free-State	Joel Ryan; John Fee	2	0.77
Total votes cast		260	
Illegally cast		–	–
Pro-slavery gain			

House District 13
Faction	Candidates	Votes	%
Pro-slavery	H. B. C. Harris; J. Weddell	412	100
Total votes cast		412	
Illegally cast		–	–
Pro-slavery gain			

House District 14
Faction	Candidates	Votes	%
Pro-slavery	H. B. McMeeken; Archy Payne; W. G. Mathias	897	93.83
Free-State	Felix G. Braden; Samuel France; F. Browning	59	6.17
Total votes cast		956	
Illegally cast		906	94.77
Results abrogated; new election ordered			

==== May 22 election results ====
House District 2
Faction	Candidates	Votes	%
Free-State	John Hutchison; Erastus. D. Ladd; Philip P. Fowler	288	94.12
–	"Scattering" votes	18	5.88
Total votes cast		306	
Free-State gain			

House District 3
Faction	Candidates	Votes	%
Free-State	Augustus Wattles; William Jessee	127	100
Total votes cast		127	
Free-State gain			

House District 4
Faction	Candidate	Votes	%
Free-State	Cyrus K. Holliday	148	99.33
–	"Scattering" votes	1	0.67
Total votes cast		149	
Free-State gain			

House District 14
Faction	Candidates	Votes	%
Pro-slavery	H. B. McMeeken; Archy Payne; W. G. Mathias	700	97.90
–	"Scattering" votes	15	2.10
Total votes cast		715	
Pro-slavery gain			

=== Outcome ===
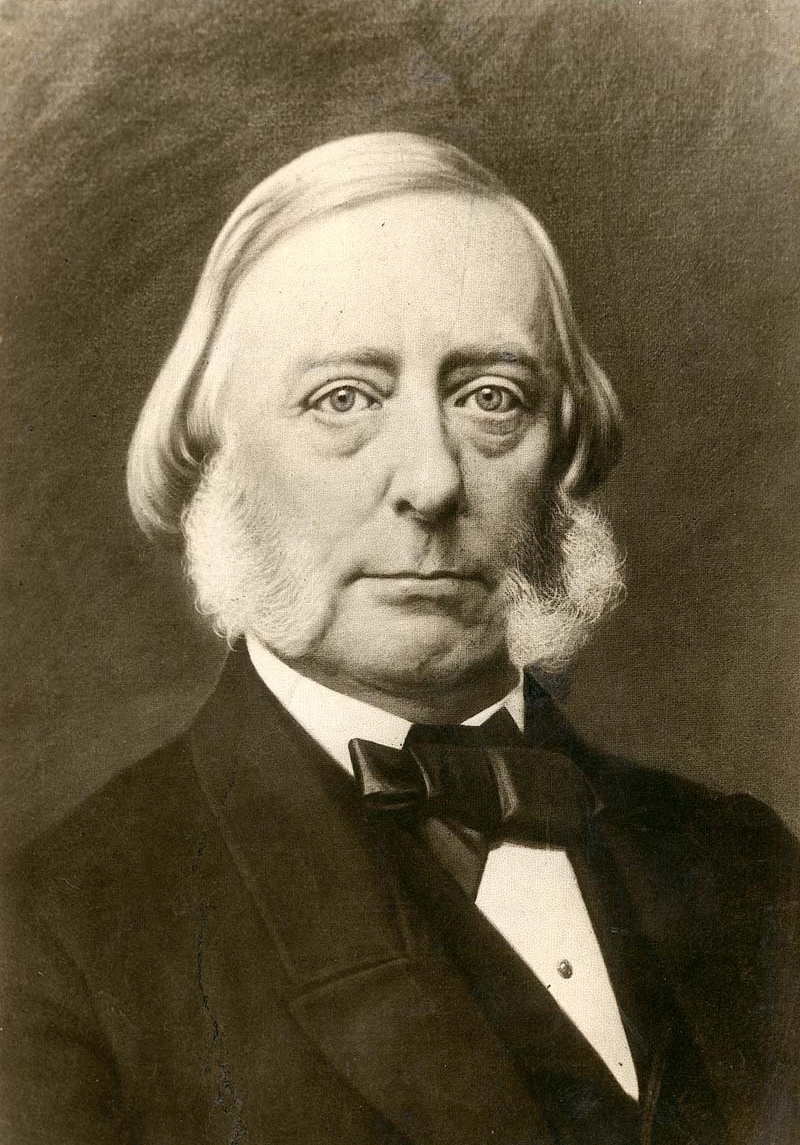
After the March 30, 1855 elections were marred by voting fraud, Kansas Territorial governor Andrew Horatio Reeder called for new elections in select districts.

Initial returns suggested that voters had chosen 13 pro-slavery councilmen and 25 pro-slavery representatives. Free-state settlers immediately cried foul, citing demonstrable voting irregularities, leading the governor of Kansas Territory, Andrew Horatio Reeder, to scrutinize the results. On April 6, 1855, he declared Martin F. Conway the winner of the sixth district, and he also called for new elections for Council Districts 2–3 and House Districts 2–4, and 14. These elections, held on May 22, were all won by Free-Staters with the exception of the House District 14 race.

After the governor granted election certificates, the Council was consequently left with 10 pro-slavery and 3 Free-state members, whereas the House was left with 18 pro-slavery and 8 Free-state members. When the territorial legislature met for the first time on July 2, 1855, however, it expelled all the Free-state men who had been elected in May. The remaining Free-State representative, S. D. Houston, would resign in protest on July 23. (Note: The Free-State councilman M. F. Conway never took his seat, officially resigning on July 3, 1855.) The legislature's decision to eject most of its Free-State members led to many in Kansas denouncing it as the "Bogus Legislature".

On March 19, 1856, the US House of Representatives tasked a special committee, comprising William A. Howard (O-Michigan), John Sherman (O-Ohio), and Mordecai Oliver (O-Missouri), with investigating "the troubles in the Territory of Kansas." Their report, "Report of the Special Committee Appointed to Investigate the Troubles in Kansas", was published later in 1856. In this document, the committee's majority contended that "each election in the Territory, held under the organic or alleged Territorial law, has been carried by organized invasion from the State of Missouri by which the people of the Territory have been prevented from exercising the rights secured to them by the organic law."

The majority further argued that "the alleged Territorial legislature was an illegally constituted body, and had no power to pass valid laws, and their enactments are therefore null and void." For these reasons, the committee majority concluded that "in the present condition of the Territory a fair election cannot be held without a new census, a stringent and well-guarded election law, the selection of impartial judges, and the presence of United States troops at every place of election."

== Congressional delegate election results ==
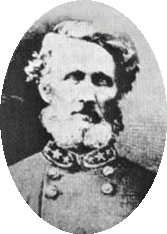
John Wilkins Whitfield was elected as Kansas Territory's congressional delegate in the October 1, 1855 election. The legality of that election would later be questioned by the United States House of Representatives.

=== October 1 (Pro-Slavery) elections ===
Congressional delegate (October 1, 1855)
Party	Candidate	Votes	%
Pro-slavery Democrat	John Wilkins Whitfield	2,721	99.38
–	"Scattering" votes	17	0.62
Total votes cast		2,738	
Pro-Slavery Democrat selected as delegate			

=== October 9 (Free-State) elections ===
Congressional delegate (October 9, 1855)
Party	Candidate	Votes	%
Free-State Democrat	Andrew H. Reeder	2,849	100
Total votes cast		2,849	
Free-State Democrat selected as delegate			

=== Outcome ===
Following the two elections, Whitfield (the incumbent who had last been elected in 1854) presented his election credentials to the 34th United States Congress and was subsequently seated as the delegate from Kansas Territory. Following this, Reeder petitioned Congress to eject Whitfield and install himself as the valid delegate. In response to this conflict, the House of Representatives issued the "Report of the Special Committee Appointed to Investigate the Troubles in Kansas", penned by a special committee tasked with analyzing the territory's elections.

In the report, the majority agreed that "the election under which the sitting delegate, John Whitfield, holds his seat, was not held in pursuance of any valid law and that it should be regarded only as the expression of the voice of those resident citizens who voted for him." However, the committee majority also argued that "the election, under which the contesting delegate, Andrew H. Reeder, claims his seat, was not held in pursuance of law, and that it should be regarded only as the expression of the resident citizens who voted for him."

As a result, the House voted on August 1, 1856 to vacate Whitfield's seat and hold a new election. In the subsequent election, Whitfield would again be elected, and Reeder would again contest the results. In 1857, the Committee on Elections once again recommended that Whitfield be declared not entitled to the seat because non-residents had voted and because many Kansans had been disenfranchised in the 1856 election, but the House narrowly decided to table the resolution. Whitfield served provisionally from December 9, 1856, to March 3, 1857.

== Bibliography ==
- Admire, W. W., ed. (1891). Admire's Political and Legislative Hand-Book for Kansas. Topeka, KS: George W. Crane & Co – via Google Books.
- Andreas, Alfred T. (1883). History of the State of Kansas. Vol. 1. Chicago, IL: A. T. Andreas – via Google Books.
- Bartlett, D. W., ed. (1865). Cases of Contested Elections in Congress, from 1834 to 1865, Inclusive. Washington, DC: Government Printing Office – via Google Books.
- Hinds, Asher L. (1907). Hinds' Precedents of the House of Representatives of the United States. Vol. 1. Washington, DC: Government Printing Office – via Google Books.
- Howard, William A.; Sherman, John; Oliver, Mordecai (1856). Report of the Special Committee Appointed to Investigate the Troubles in Kansas (Report). Washington, DC: United States House of Representatives – via the Library of Congress.
- Kansas State Historical Society (1881). "Governor Andrew H. Reeder". Transactions of the Kansas State Historical Society. Topeka: Kansas Publishing House. pp. 145–156.
- Socolofsky, Homer E. (2021). Kansas Governors. Topeka: University Press of Kansas. ISBN 9780700631704.
- United States Congress (1950). Biographical Directory of the American Congress: 1774-1949. Washington, DC: Government Printing Office – via Google Books.
