= Reeder Township, Kansas =

Reeder Township
- Township
- Location in Anderson County
- Coordinates: 38°19′30″N 095°26′01″W
- Country: United States
- State: Kansas
- County: Anderson

Area
  - Total: 72.5 sq mi (187.8 km^{2})
  - Land: 72.0 sq mi (186.6 km^{2})
  - Water: 0.46 sq mi (1.2 km^{2}) 0.66%
- Elevation: 988 ft (301 m)

Population (2010)
  - Total: 452
  - Density: 6.2/sq mi (2.4/km^{2})
- GNIS feature ID: 0477581

Reeder Township is a township in Anderson County, Kansas, United States. As of the 2010 census, its population was 452.

== History ==
Reeder Township was established in 1857. It was named for Andrew Horatio Reeder, first Territorial Governor of Kansas.

== Geography ==
Reeder Township covers an area of 72.5 square miles (187.8 km^{2}) and contains one incorporated settlement, Harris. According to the USGS, it contains four cemeteries: Baird, Bethel, Central City and Patton.

The streams of Elm Creek, Kenoma Creek, Rocky Run and Thomas Creek run through this township.

== Transportation ==
Reeder Township contains two airports or landing strips: Graham Farms Airport and Graham Farms Auxiliary Airport.
