= Thaddeus Hyatt =

American abolitionist and inventor

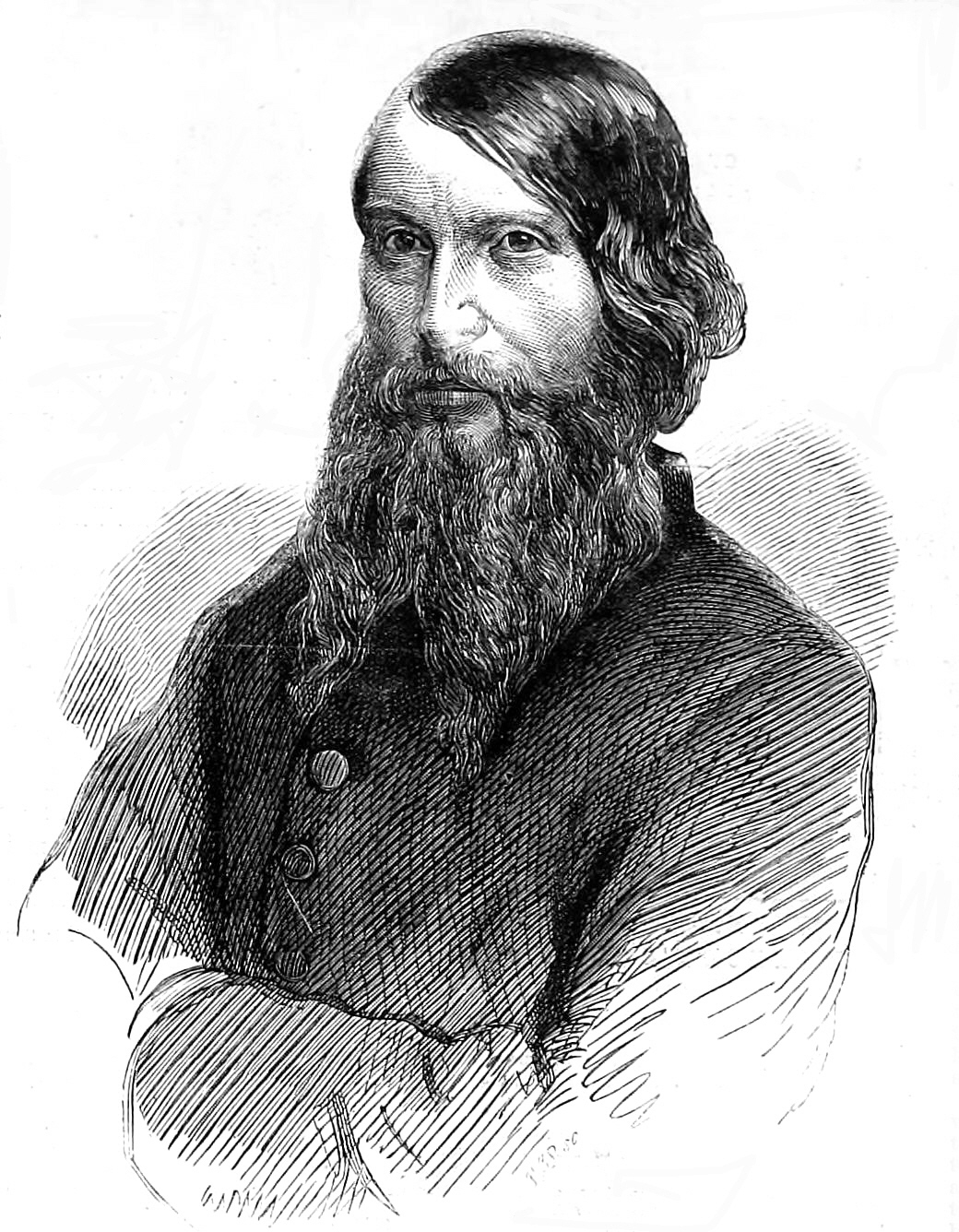
Thaddeus Hyatt

Thaddeus Hyatt (July 21, 1816 – July 25, 1901) was an American abolitionist and inventor. In his opposition to slavery, Hyatt organized the efforts of abolitionists in Kansas to have the territory admitted to the Union as a free-state and campaigned for the federal government to aid Kansans afflicted by drought. Hyatt befriended John Brown and provided Brown with financial support; following the raid on Harpers Ferry, Hyatt was investigated by a committee of the United States Senate. When Hyatt refused to comply with a Congressional subpoena and cooperate with the Senate investigation, the Senate voted to jail the recalcitrant abolitionist. As an inventor, Hyatt was a wealthy man, profiting from his invention of iron-and-glass vault covers for admitting sunlight to spaces below sidewalks and pavements. Hyatt also innovated and patented several designs for reinforced concrete floors.

== Abolitionist ==
=== In Kansas ===
Born in Rahway, New Jersey, Thaddeus Hyatt became actively involved in the abolitionist movement after Congress passed the Kansas-Nebraska Act in 1854. The law, which mandated that the question of legalizing slavery in Kansas be settled by the territory's voters, sparked a race between pro-slavery and anti-slavery factions to move to Kansas and tip the ballot boxes. Opposing settlers violently clashed in what became known as Bleeding Kansas. In 1854, several state-level committees were formed to provide aid to anti-slavery settlers in Kansas, including the New York Kansas League, of which Thaddeus Hyatt was president. Along with well-known abolitionists such as Andrew Reeder, Gerrit Smith, and Eli Thayer, Hyatt organized the National Kansas Committee in July 1856, and was elected president of the organization. The National Kansas Committee purportedly collected around $100,000 to sponsor two thousand new settlers. Of this amount, around $10,000 was spent on weaponry. Although the organization was active from July 1856, onward, the entire committee formally convened only once, in January 1857, Among the items delivered to settlers were one hundred tons of seeds, the cost of which Hyatt underwrote. By mid-1857, the National Committee had dispersed its supplies and depleted its funds, and the activities of the organization wound down.

Hyatt led the settlement of Hyattville, Kansas, by 84 men, hoping to keep the unemployed militiamen from stirring up trouble in Lawrence. Hyattville was located on the South fork of Pottawattamie Creek in Anderson County. Thaddeus Hyatt, along with William Arny, the general agent of the National Kansas Committee, were accused of using Hyatt's namesake town as a scheme to turn a profit for themselves. Hyatt and Arny persuaded the Kansas State Central Committee to allow them to change how funds from the National Committee were dispersed by the State Central Committee, redirecting the funds and resources to the Hyattville venture. William Hutchinson, who was tasked with reporting the incident to the National Committee, placed the majority of the blame on Arny for influencing Hyatt, and wrote that the scandal caused "an open rupture" between the State and National Committee. For his part, Hyatt maintained that the claims were perpetrated by a "slanderer", and believed that the dispute was a subterfuge to "crush the National Committee". Despite this, Hyattville appears to have succeeded, at least temporarily. In the present day, the town no longer exists.

The National Kansas Committee came well short of its own expectations. Originally, the Committee intended for similar organizations to be set up at the state, county, and town level in each and every locality in the Union to direct efforts to fill Kansas with anti-slavery voters. The National Committee failed to unify even the patchwork of local Kansas Committees that were already operating, in part because of a lack of communication between the different groups and people. For example, Thaddeus Hyatt and William Barnes both embarked on simultaneous, but separate efforts to organize counties in New York State.

=== Helping John Brown ===
Hyatt came under suspicion after John Brown's unsuccessful raid on Harpers Ferry. Hyatt supported Brown's ideology of militant abolitionism, providing Brown with financial support, and Brown often visited Hyatt's house in New York. The National Committee had met Brown early in 1857 and indirectly provided him with two hundred Sharps rifles, which Brown took to Harpers Ferry, but the Committee largely reneged on its promise of $5,000 to Brown, as the organization had run out of money. A Senate committee tasked with probing the causes of the Harpers Ferry raid discovered that Hyatt was mentioned several times in Brown's personal papers and subpoenaed him on January 24, 1860, to testify before the committee. Hyatt equivocated as to whether or not he would testify for a month. Senator Mason, the chair of the Harper's Ferry Special Committee, finally lost patience and Hyatt was arrested by the Senate Sergeant at Arms and brought before the Senate on March 6. The Senate demanded to know why Hyatt had ignored the subpoena and whether Hyatt would now submit to the Senate Committee. Three days later, Hyatt submitted a twenty-page document in which his lawyers contended that the Senate investigation of Hyatt constituted a judicial trial; therefore, the Senate had overstepped its powers under the Constitution, as the Senate only had judicial power in the cases of evaluating the qualifications of its members, expelling Senators, and conducting impeachment trials. The document argued that "to compel witnesses to attend before a committee to give information in regard to proposed legislation, is not a power given by the Constitution." The New York Times reported that the sheer length of the document, which was read aloud on the Senate floor, physically exhausted two Senate clerks and most of the Senators refused to stay during the reading. Unimpressed by his argument, the Senate voted to confine Thaddeus Hyatt to the District of Columbia jail until he agreed to testify. Hyatt declined to petition the Supreme Court for habeas corpus. After three months of unsuccessful attempts to interrogate key witnesses regarding Harpers Ferry, the Senate investigative committee was dissolved and Hyatt was released on June 15.

Even after the violence in Kansas died down, Hyatt continued to be a major figure supporting the state. 1860 marked the culmination of a devastating drought in Kansas, and Hyatt traveled to Kansas to view the damage and direct his newly formed Kansas Relief Committee's aid to starving settlers. Hyatt was outraged by the inattention of both national newspapers and the federal government; in response, he petitioned outgoing President James Buchanan in a seventy-page pamphlet to provide more federal aid and halt foreclosures, as many Kansan farmers had been impoverished by the drought and could not meet the payments needed to keep their land. Buchanan did little to help the state aside from a monetary donation—the President vetoed the Homestead Act of 1860, which would have delayed the foreclosures.

Thaddeus Hyatt was at Rose Hill, Falmouth, England when his wife gave birth to a son on 28 August 1869. He moved to London and rented a warehouse at 9 Farringdon Road next door to that of Christopher Dresser at number 7. His pavement lights can be seen in both US and UK cities.

Hyatt died in 1901 at the age of 85 in his summer residence, at Sandown, on the Isle of Wight.

== Thaddeus Hyatt Collection ==
The Thaddeus Hyatt Collection is a collection of accounts and correspondence given by Hyatt to the Kansas State Historical Society. The majority of the material concerns activity between 1854 and 1861, particularly during Bleeding Kansas. Notable accounts of Bleeding Kansas in the collection include those of S. P. Hand, Alexander McArthur, James Hall, Jerome Hazen, John Ritchie, J. A. Harvey, and N. W. Spicer.
