= North Rich Township, Kansas =

North Rich Township
- Township
- Location in Anderson County
- Coordinates: 38°07′05″N 095°07′56″W
- Country: United States
- State: Kansas
- County: Anderson

Area
  - Total: 23.9 sq mi (62.0 km^{2})
  - Land: 23.8 sq mi (61.7 km^{2})
  - Water: 0.077 sq mi (0.2 km^{2}) 0.36%
- Elevation: 1,076 ft (328 m)

Population (2010)
  - Total: 107
  - Density: 4.4/sq mi (1.7/km^{2})
- GNIS feature ID: 0478138

North Rich Township was a township in Anderson County, Kansas, United States. It was dissolved and merged into Rich Township in 2017. As of the 2016 American Community Survey, its population was estimated to be 90 people. As of the 2010 census, its population was 107.

== Geography ==
North Rich Township covered an area of 23.9 square miles (62.0 km^{2}) and contained no incorporated settlements.
