= Lone Elm, Kansas =

City in Anderson County, Kansas

- City
- Location within Anderson County and Kansas

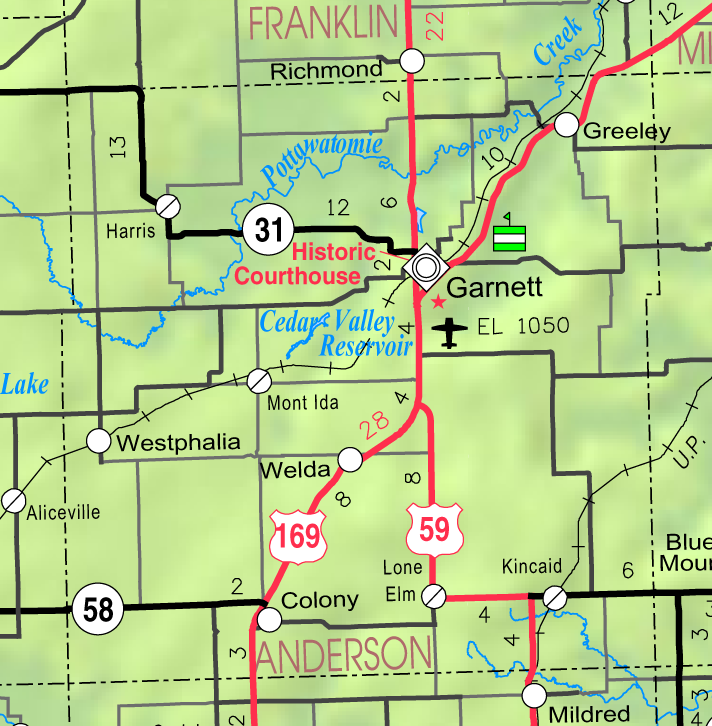
- KDOT map of Anderson County (legend)
- Coordinates: 38°04′47″N 95°14′35″W
- Country: United States
- State: Kansas
- County: Anderson
- Township: Lone Elm
- Founded: 1870s
- Incorporated: 1924

Area
  - Total: 0.069 sq mi (0.18 km^{2})
  - Land: 0.069 sq mi (0.18 km^{2})
  - Water: 0 sq mi (0.00 km^{2})
- Elevation: 1,106 ft (337 m)

Population (2020)
  - Total: 27
  - Density: 390/sq mi (150/km^{2})
- Time zone: UTC-6 (CST)
  - Summer (DST): UTC-5 (CDT)
- ZIP Code: 66039
- Area code: 620
- FIPS code: 20-42425
- GNIS ID: 2395749

Lone Elm is a city in Lone Elm Township, Anderson County, Kansas, United States. As of the 2020 census, the population of the city was 27.

== History ==
A post office was opened in Lone Elm in 1879, and remained in operation until it was discontinued in 1956.

Circa 1910, Lone Elm had a bank, a dozen retail establishments, and a population of 175.

== Geography ==
According to the United States Census Bureau, the city has a total area of 0.08 square miles (0.21 km^{2}), all land.

== Demographics ==
Historical population
Census	Pop.	Note	%±
1930	131		—
1940	97		−26.0%
1950	82		−15.5%
1960	69		−15.9%
1970	66		−4.3%
1980	55		−16.7%
1990	32		−41.8%
2000	27		−15.6%
2010	25		−7.4%
2020	27		8.0%
U.S. Decennial Census

=== 2020 census ===
The 2020 United States census counted 27 people, 12 households, and 10 families in Lone Elm. The population density was 397.1 per square mile (153.3/km^{2}). There were 14 housing units at an average density of 205.9 per square mile (79.5/km^{2}). The racial makeup was 88.89% (24) white or European American (88.89% non-Hispanic white), 0.0% (0) black or African-American, 0.0% (0) Native American or Alaska Native, 0.0% (0) Asian, 0.0% (0) Pacific Islander or Native Hawaiian, 3.7% (1) from other races, and 7.41% (2) from two or more races. Hispanic or Latino of any race was 0.0% (0) of the population.

Of the 12 households, 50.0% had children under the age of 18; 58.3% were married couples living together; 16.7% had a female householder with no spouse or partner present. 16.7% of households consisted of individuals and 8.3% had someone living alone who was 65 years of age or older. The average household size was 1.3 and the average family size was 2.0.

29.6% of the population was under the age of 18, 3.7% from 18 to 24, 25.9% from 25 to 44, 18.5% from 45 to 64, and 22.2% who were 65 years of age or older. The median age was 42.2 years. For every 100 females, there were 125.0 males. For every 100 females ages 18 and older, there were 137.5 males.

=== 2010 census ===
As of the census of 2010, there were 25 people, 12 households, and 7 families residing in the city. The population density was 312.5 inhabitants per square mile (120.7/km^{2}). There were 18 housing units at an average density of 225.0 per square mile (86.9/km^{2}). The racial makeup of the city was 100.0% White.

There were 12 households, of which 33.3% had children under the age of 18 living with them, 50.0% were married couples living together, 8.3% had a female householder with no husband present, and 41.7% were non-families. 41.7% of all households were made up of individuals, and 33.3% had someone living alone who was 65 years of age or older. The average household size was 2.08 and the average family size was 2.71.

The median age in the city was 46.8 years. 24% of residents were under the age of 18; 0.0% were between the ages of 18 and 24; 20% were from 25 to 44; 32% were from 45 to 64; and 24% were 65 years of age or older. The gender makeup of the city was 44.0% male and 56.0% female.

=== 2000 census ===
As of the census of 2000, there were 27 people, 12 households, and 9 families residing in the city. The population density was 371.4 inhabitants per square mile (143.4/km^{2}). There were 17 housing units at an average density of 233.8 per square mile (90.3/km^{2}). The racial makeup of the city was 100.00% White. Hispanic or Latino of any race were 3.70% of the population.

There were 12 households, out of which 25.0% had children under the age of 18 living with them, 75.0% were married couples living together, and 25.0% were non-families. 25.0% of all households were made up of individuals, and 16.7% had someone living alone who was 65 years of age or older. The average household size was 2.25 and the average family size was 2.67.

In the city, the population was spread out, with 18.5% under the age of 18, 14.8% from 25 to 44, 33.3% from 45 to 64, and 33.3% who were 65 years of age or older. The median age was 60 years. For every 100 females, there were 107.7 males. For every 100 females age 18 and over, there were 83.3 males.

The median income for a household in the city was $32,500, and the median income for a family was $31,250. Males had a median income of $36,250 versus $0 for females. The per capita income for the city was $18,885. None of the population and none of the families were below the poverty line.

== Education ==
Lone Elm is part of Unified School District 479. The district high school is Crest High School.

== Notable people ==
- John Lintner, financial economist
