= Crest High School =

There are multiple schools named Crest High School:

- Crest High School (Kansas) in Colony, Kansas
- Crest High School (North Carolina) in Boiling Springs, North Carolina
