= Law and Order Party (Kansas) =

Pro-slavery political party founded in Kansas, USA, in 1855

The Law and Order Party was a pro-slavery political party founded October 3, 1855, in Leavenworth, Kansas during the Bleeding Kansas period.

Founders of the party included David Rice Atchison and Joseph C. Anderson.

Eleven members of the Bogus Legislature aligned themselves with the Law and Order Party: W.G. Mathias, Richard R. Rees, D.A.N. Grover, Andrew McDonald, William Barbee, W.P. Richardson, John H. Stringfellow, Lucien Eastin, S.A. Williams, Archibald Payne, and Joseph C. Anderson.
