= Putnam Township, Anderson County, Kansas =

Putnam Township
- Township
- Location in Anderson County
- Coordinates: 38°22′10″N 095°16′01″W
- Country: United States
- State: Kansas
- County: Anderson

Area
  - Total: 33.6 sq mi (86.9 km^{2})
  - Land: 33.4 sq mi (86.6 km^{2})
  - Water: 0.15 sq mi (0.4 km^{2}) 0.41%
- Elevation: 1,014 ft (309 m)

Population (2010)
  - Total: 305
  - Density: 9.1/sq mi (3.5/km^{2})
- GNIS feature ID: 0477589

Putnam Township is a township in Anderson County, Kansas, United States. As of the 2010 census, its population was 305.

== History ==
Putnam Township was established in 1870. It was named for Leander Putnam.

== Geography ==
Putnam Township covers an area of 33.6 square miles (86.9 km^{2}) and contains no incorporated settlements. According to the USGS, it contains one cemetery, West Scipio.

The stream of Dry Branch runs through this township.
