= Harris, Kansas =

Unincorporated community in Anderson County, Kansas

- CDP
- Location within Anderson County and Kansas

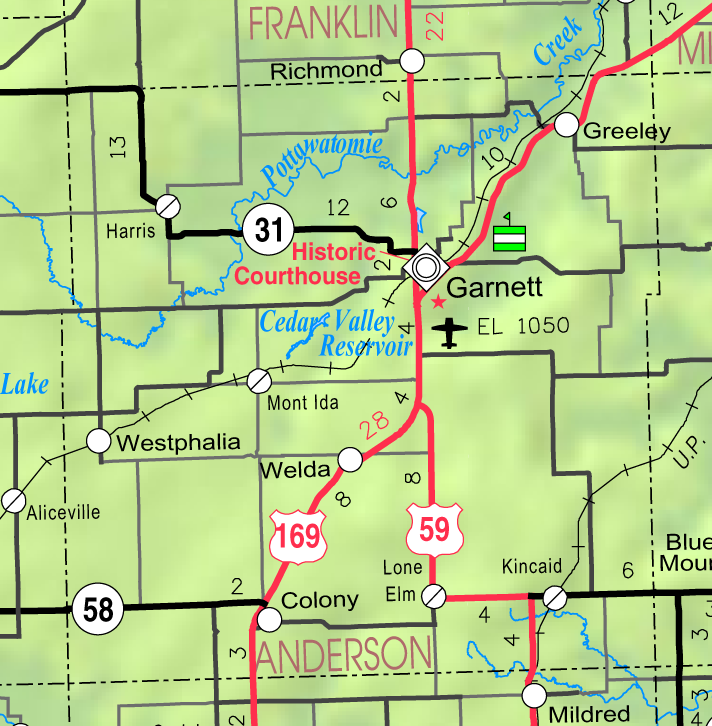
- KDOT map of Anderson County (legend)
- Coordinates: 38°19′14″N 95°26′42″W
- Country: United States
- State: Kansas
- County: Anderson
- Township: Reeder
- Founded: 1886

Area
  - Total: 0.36 sq mi (0.93 km^{2})
  - Land: 0.35 sq mi (0.91 km^{2})
  - Water: 0.012 sq mi (0.03 km^{2})
- Elevation: 994 ft (303 m)

Population (2020)
  - Total: 47
  - Density: 130/sq mi (52/km^{2})
- Time zone: UTC-6 (CST)
  - Summer (DST): UTC-5 (CDT)
- ZIP Code: 66032
- Area code: 785
- FIPS code: 20-30250
- GNIS ID: 2629159

Harris is a census-designated place (CDP) in Reeder Township, Anderson County, Kansas, United States. As of the 2020 census, the population was 47.

== History ==
Harris was founded in 1886. It was a station on the Missouri Pacific Railroad.

The post office in Harris was discontinued in 1971.

== Geography ==
According to the United States Census Bureau, the CDP has a total area of 0.36 square miles (0.93 km^{2}), of which 0.35 square miles (0.91 km^{2}) is land and 0.01 square miles (0.03 km^{2}) is water.

== Demographics ==
Historical population
Census	Pop.	Note	%±
1990	39		—
2000	53		35.9%
2010	51		−3.8%
2020	47		−7.8%
U.S. Decennial Census

=== 2020 census ===
The 2020 United States census counted 47 people, 20 households, and 15 families in Harris. The population density was 132.8 per square mile (51.3/km^{2}). There were 20 housing units at an average density of 56.5 per square mile (21.8/km^{2}). The racial makeup was 95.74% (45) white or European American (95.74% non-Hispanic white), 2.13% (1) black or African-American, 0.0% (0) Native American or Alaska Native, 0.0% (0) Asian, 0.0% (0) Pacific Islander or Native Hawaiian, 0.0% (0) from other races, and 2.13% (1) from two or more races. Hispanic or Latino of any race was 0.0% (0) of the population.

Of the 20 households, 20.0% had children under the age of 18; 70.0% were married couples living together; 20.0% had a female householder with no spouse or partner present. 25.0% of households consisted of individuals and 15.0% had someone living alone who was 65 years of age or older. The average household size was 2.0 and the average family size was 2.0. The percent of those with a bachelor's degree or higher was estimated to be 0.0% of the population.

21.3% of the population was under the age of 18, 17.0% from 18 to 24, 8.5% from 25 to 44, 23.4% from 45 to 64, and 29.8% who were 65 years of age or older. The median age was 50.5 years. For every 100 females, there were 104.3 males. For every 100 females ages 18 and older, there were 146.7 males.

=== 2010 census ===
As of the census of 2010, there were 51 people, 21 households, and 13 families residing in the CDP. The population density was 145.7 inhabitants per square mile (56.3/km^{2}). There were 26 housing units at an average density of 74.3 per square mile (28.7/km^{2}). The racial makeup of the CDP was 100.0% White. Hispanic or Latino of any race were 5.9% of the population.

There were 21 households, of which 38.1% had children under the age of 18 living with them, 47.6% were married couples living together, 14.3% had a female householder with no husband present, and 38.1% were non-families. 33.3% of all households were made up of individuals, and 9.5% had someone living alone who was 65 years of age or older. The average household size was 2.43 and the average family size was 3.15.

The median age in the CDP was 38.8 years. 29.4% of residents were under the age of 18; 5.9% were between the ages of 18 and 24; 23.5% were from 25 to 44; 25.5% were from 45 to 64; and 15.7% were 65 years of age or older. The gender makeup of the CDP was 51.0% male and 49.0% female.

=== 2000 census ===
As of the census of 2000, there were 53 people, 21 households, and 14 families residing in the city. The population density was 439.4 inhabitants per square mile (169.7/km^{2}). There were 26 housing units at an average density of 215.6 per square mile (83.2/km^{2}). The racial makeup of the city was 100.00% White.

There were 21 households, out of which 33.3% had children under the age of 18 living with them, 66.7% were married couples living together, 4.8% had a female householder with no husband present, and 28.6% were non-families. 28.6% of all households were made up of individuals, and 14.3% had someone living alone who was 65 years of age or older. The average household size was 2.52 and the average family size was 3.07.

In the city the population was spread out with 28.3% under the age of 18, 1.9% from 18 to 24, 30.2% from 25 to 44, 22.6% from 45 to 64, and 17.0% who were 65 years of age or older. The median age was 38 years. For every 100 females, there were 103.8 males. For every 100 females age 18 and over, there were 81.0 males.

The median income for a household in the city was $34,375, and the median income for a family was $33,125. Males had a median income of $30,625 versus $17,917 for females. The per capita income for the city was $13,259. There were 23.1% of families and 15.2% of the population living below the poverty line, including no under eighteens and 10.5% of those over 64.

== See also ==
- National Register of Historic Places listings in Anderson County, Kansas
