= Colony, Kansas =

City in Anderson County, Kansas

- City
- Location within Anderson County and Kansas

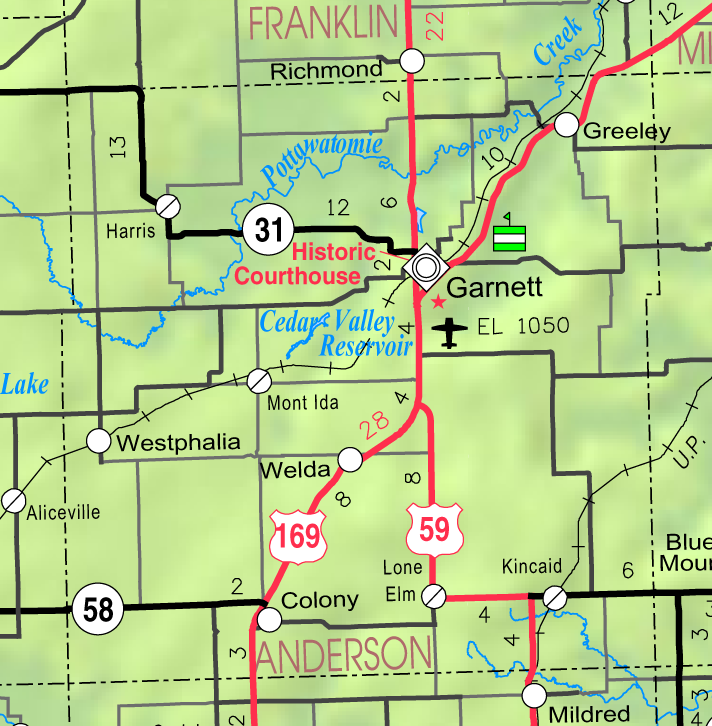
- KDOT map of Anderson County (legend)
- Coordinates: 38°4′16″N 95°21′46″W
- Country: United States
- State: Kansas
- County: Anderson
- Township: Ozark
- Founded: 1872
- Incorporated: 1886

Area
  - Total: 0.48 sq mi (1.25 km^{2})
  - Land: 0.48 sq mi (1.25 km^{2})
  - Water: 0 sq mi (0.00 km^{2})
- Elevation: 1,119 ft (341 m)

Population (2020)
  - Total: 381
  - Density: 789/sq mi (305/km^{2})
- Time zone: UTC-6 (CST)
  - Summer (DST): UTC-5 (CDT)
- ZIP Code: 66015
- Area code: 620
- FIPS code: 20-14950
- GNIS ID: 2393603

Colony is a city in Ozark Township, Anderson County, Kansas, United States. As of the 2020 census, the population of the city was 381.

== History ==
Colony got its start in the year 1872 following construction of the railroad through that territory. It was named for a colony from Ohio and Indiana, which settled in the neighborhood.

The railroad tracks in Colony have since been converted to a rail trail. The trail is part of the Prairie Spirit Trail State Park.

== Geography ==
According to the United States Census Bureau, the city has a total area of 0.52 square miles (1.35 km^{2}), all land.

=== Climate ===
The climate in this area is characterized by hot, humid summers and generally mild to cool winters. According to the Köppen Climate Classification system, Colony has a humid subtropical climate, abbreviated "Cfa" on climate maps.

== Demographics ==
Historical population
| Census | Pop. | Note | %± |
|---|---|---|---|
| 1880 | 114 | | — |
| 1890 | 474 | | 315.8% |
| 1900 | 483 | | 1.9% |
| 1910 | 530 | | 9.7% |
| 1920 | 997 | | 88.1% |
| 1930 | 596 | | −40.2% |
| 1940 | 420 | | −29.5% |
| 1950 | 386 | | −8.1% |
| 1960 | 419 | | 8.5% |
| 1970 | 382 | | −8.8% |
| 1980 | 474 | | 24.1% |
| 1990 | 447 | | −5.7% |
| 2000 | 397 | | −11.2% |
| 2010 | 408 | | 2.8% |
| 2020 | 381 | | −6.6% |
U.S. Decennial Census

=== 2020 census ===
The 2020 United States census counted 381 people, 154 households, and 99 families in Colony. The population density was 787.2 per square mile (303.9/km^{2}). There were 188 housing units at an average density of 388.4 per square mile (150.0/km^{2}). The racial makeup was 91.86% (350) white or European American (91.86% non-Hispanic white), 0.0% (0) black or African-American, 0.79% (3) Native American or Alaska Native, 0.26% (1) Asian, 0.0% (0) Pacific Islander or Native Hawaiian, 1.05% (4) from other races, and 6.04% (23) from two or more races. Hispanic or Latino of any race was 2.1% (8) of the population.

Of the 154 households, 32.5% had children under the age of 18; 46.8% were married couples living together; 27.9% had a female householder with no spouse or partner present. 32.5% of households consisted of individuals and 13.0% had someone living alone who was 65 years of age or older. The average household size was 2.4 and the average family size was 3.5. The percent of those with a bachelor's degree or higher was estimated to be 12.9% of the population.

24.4% of the population was under the age of 18, 7.6% from 18 to 24, 19.9% from 25 to 44, 23.9% from 45 to 64, and 24.1% who were 65 years of age or older. The median age was 43.3 years. For every 100 females, there were 107.1 males. For every 100 females ages 18 and older, there were 104.3 males.

The 2016–2020 5-year American Community Survey estimates show that the median household income was $37,500 (with a margin of error of +/- $12,275) and the median family income was $46,875 (+/- $22,573). Males had a median income of $32,500 (+/- $7,090) versus $21,181 (+/- $3,906) for females. The median income for those above 16 years old was $27,625 (+/- $6,719). Approximately, 18.8% of families and 24.6% of the population were below the poverty line, including 24.5% of those under the age of 18 and 28.3% of those ages 65 or over.

=== 2010 census ===
As of the census of 2010, there were 408 people, 177 households, and 112 families residing in the city. The population density was 784.6 inhabitants per square mile (302.9/km^{2}). There were 192 housing units at an average density of 369.2 per square mile (142.5/km^{2}). The racial makeup of the city was 94.4% White, 1.7% African American, 0.2% Native American, 0.2% Asian, and 3.4% from two or more races. Hispanic or Latino of any race were 0.2% of the population.

There were 177 households, of which 26.0% had children under the age of 18 living with them, 50.3% were married couples living together, 9.0% had a female householder with no husband present, 4.0% had a male householder with no wife present, and 36.7% were non-families. 34.5% of all households were made up of individuals, and 19.7% had someone living alone who was 65 years of age or older. The average household size was 2.31 and the average family size was 2.98.

The median age in the city was 44.5 years. 24% of residents were under the age of 18; 7.6% were between the ages of 18 and 24; 19.1% were from 25 to 44; 24% were from 45 to 64; and 25.2% were 65 years of age or older. The gender makeup of the city was 49.5% male and 50.5% female.

=== 2000 census ===
As of the census of 2000, there were 397 people, 160 households, and 120 families residing in the city. The population density was 794.7 inhabitants per square mile (306.8/km^{2}). There were 186 housing units at an average density of 372.3 per square mile (143.7/km^{2}). The racial makeup of the city was 94.96% White, 0.25% African American, 0.76% Native American, 0.25% Asian, and 3.78% from two or more races. Hispanic or Latino of any race were 2.02% of the population.

There were 160 households, out of which 30.0% had children under the age of 18 living with them, 62.5% were married couples living together, 9.4% had a female householder with no husband present, and 24.4% were non-families. 24.4% of all households were made up of individuals, and 15.0% had someone living alone who was 65 years of age or older. The average household size was 2.48 and the average family size was 2.90.

In the city, the population was spread out, with 26.4% under the age of 18, 6.0% from 18 to 24, 21.9% from 25 to 44, 19.4% from 45 to 64, and 26.2% who were 65 years of age or older. The median age was 42 years. For every 100 females, there were 78.8 males. For every 100 females age 18 and over, there were 88.4 males.

The median income for a household in the city was $25,167, and the median income for a family was $27,708. Males had a median income of $27,917 versus $20,000 for females. The per capita income for the city was $11,398. About 13.8% of families and 16.6% of the population were below the poverty line, including 21.5% of those under age 18 and 21.6% of those age 65 or over.

== Education ==
The community is served by Crest USD 479 public school district. The district high school is Crest High School.

== Notable people ==
- Dean Brooks, psychiatrist and actor
