= Bush City, Kansas =

Unincorporated community in Anderson County, Kansas

Coordinates: 38°12′40″N 95°08′41″W

Bush City is an unincorporated community in Anderson County, Kansas, United States.

== History ==
Bush City had a post office from 1880 until 1956, but the post office was called Haskell until 1921.
