= Lincoln Township, Anderson County, Kansas =

Lincoln Township
- Township
- Location in Anderson County
- Coordinates: 38°12′45″N 095°08′16″W
- Country: United States
- State: Kansas
- County: Anderson

Area
  - Total: 49.4 sq mi (128.0 km^{2})
  - Land: 49.2 sq mi (127.4 km^{2})
  - Water: 0.23 sq mi (0.6 km^{2}) 0.45%
- Elevation: 1,033 ft (315 m)

Population (2010)
  - Total: 190
  - Density: 3.9/sq mi (1.5/km^{2})
- GNIS feature ID: 0477669

Lincoln Township is a township in Anderson County, Kansas, United States. As of the 2018 census, it has a population of 85 within its 49.2 square miles. The media age is 60.5 and the township is 58% male. There are approximately 36 households and 2.4 people per household.

== History ==
Lincoln Township was organized in 1870.

== Geography ==
Lincoln Township covers an area of 49.4 square miles (128.0 km^{2}) and contains no incorporated settlements. Neighboring townships include Centerville, Lone Elm, Monroe, North Rich, Walker, and Washington.
