= Daniel Woodson =

American politician

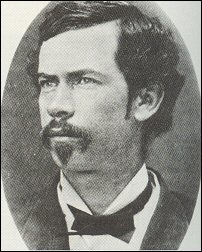

Acting Governor of Kansas Territory
- In office April 17, 1855 – June 23, 1855
- Preceded by: Andrew Horatio Reeder
- Succeeded by: Andrew Horatio Reeder
- In office August 16, 1855 – September 9, 1855
- Preceded by: Andrew Horatio Reeder
- Succeeded by: Wilson Shannon
- In office June 24, 1856 – July 7, 1856
- Preceded by: Wilson Shannon
- Succeeded by: Wilson Shannon
- In office August 18, 1856 – September 9, 1856
- Preceded by: Wilson Shannon
- Succeeded by: John White Geary
- In office March 12, 1857 – April 16, 1857
- Preceded by: John White Geary
- Succeeded by: Frederick Perry Stanton (Acting)

Personal details
- Born: May 24, 1824 Albemarle County, Virginia
- Died: October 5, 1894 (aged 70) Claremore, Indian Territory
- Party: Democratic
- Spouse: America Fuqua Christian Palmer
- Profession: printer, newspaper editor, politician, land agent

Daniel Woodson (May 24, 1824 – October 5, 1894) was secretary of Kansas Territory (1854–1857) and a five-time acting governor of the territory.

== Early life ==
Woodson was born on a farm in Albemarle County, Virginia and orphaned at age 7. He was apprenticed as a printer and became quite skilled at the trade. For eight years Woodson served as coeditor and publisher of the Democratic newspaper Lynchburg Republican. In 1851, he became editor of the Richmond Republican-Advocate, another Democratic newspaper.

== Political career ==
Woodson was appointed secretary of the Kansas Territory by President Franklin Pierce on June 29, 1854, and took the oath of office in Washington, D.C., on September 28, drawing an annual salary of $2,000. Because he was fully sympathetic to those who wanted to make Kansas a slave state, he agreed with the wishes of the proslavery forces in the territory.

While Governor Andrew Reeder was away from the territory, Woodson became acting governor, signing the first laws passed by the territorial legislature. Even though this first territorial legislature was accepted by the federal government, free staters called the laws "bogus laws".

Altogether, Woodson served as acting governor for a little more than five months during the absences of governors Andrew Reeder, Wilson Shannon, and John W. Geary.

== Later life ==
Woodson spent his last years in Parker, Kansas, where he was actively helping to establish a town which its residents believed would be located along a railroad line. When the railroad bypassed Parker, most of the citizens – including Woodson – relocated to Coffeyville, Kansas. Woodson operated a variety of newspapers, including the Coffeyville Journal. He was visiting Claremore, Indian Territory (now Oklahoma), when he died in 1894.

== Legacy ==
Woodson County, Kansas was named for him in 1855. It was the only county named for a Kansas territorial official, until 1889 when Davis County was renamed Geary County.
