= Lone Elm Township, Kansas =

Lone Elm Township
- Township
- Location in Anderson County
- Coordinates: 38°06′12″N 095°14′16″W
- Country: United States
- State: Kansas
- County: Anderson

Area
  - Total: 46.3 sq mi (119.8 km^{2})
  - Land: 45.9 sq mi (119.0 km^{2})
  - Water: 0.31 sq mi (0.8 km^{2}) 0.67%
- Elevation: 1,106 ft (337 m)

Population (2010)
  - Total: 230
  - Density: 4.9/sq mi (1.9/km^{2})
- GNIS feature ID: 0478125

Lone Elm Township is a township in Anderson County, Kansas, United States. As of the 2010 census, its population was 230.

== Geography ==
Lone Elm Township covers an area of 46.3 square miles (119.8 km^{2}) and contains one incorporated settlement, Lone Elm. According to the USGS, it contains one cemetery, Lone Elm.
