= Anderson County, Kansas =

County in Kansas, United States

- County
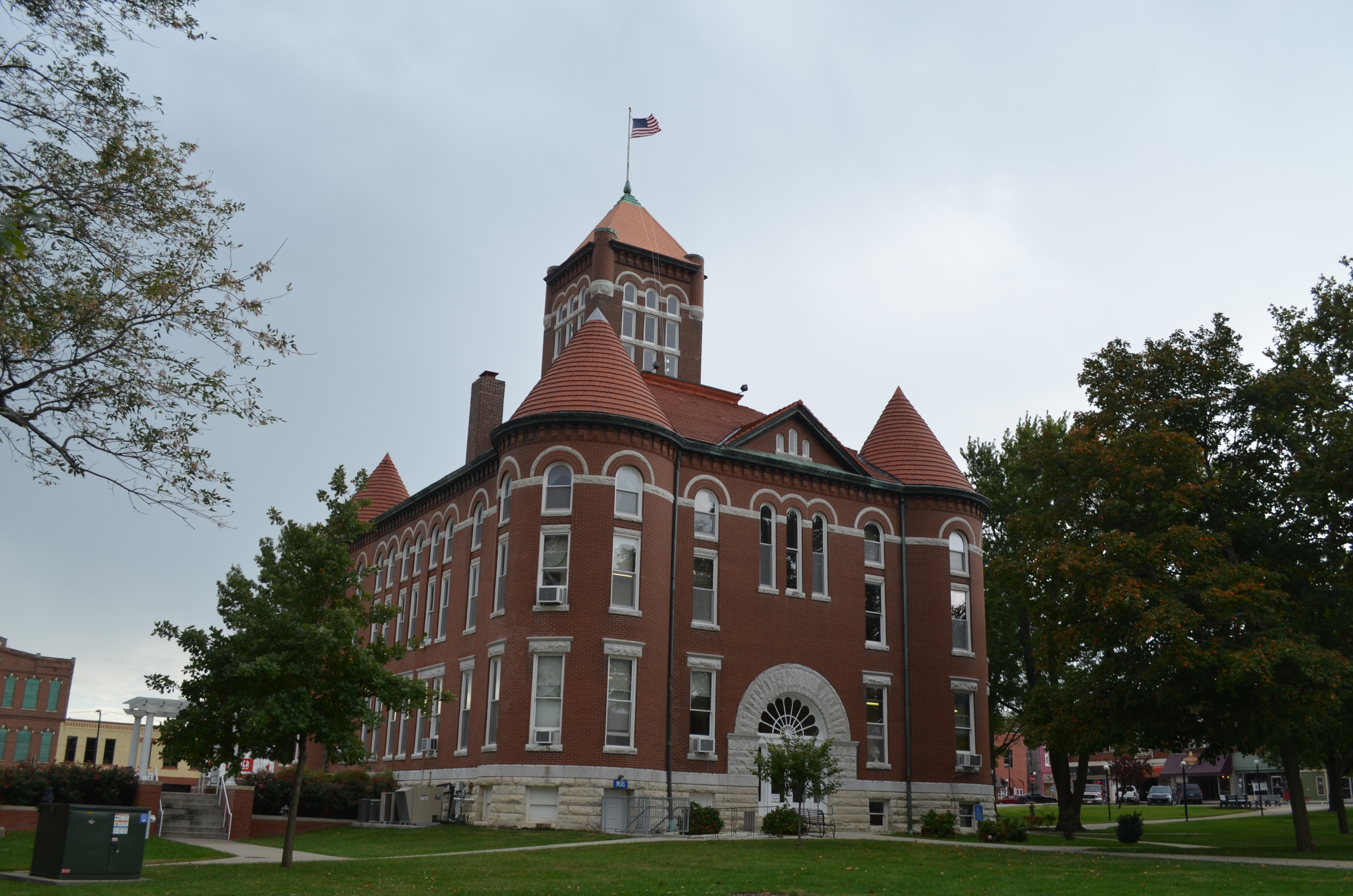
- Anderson County Courthouse in Garnett (2016)

- Logo

- Location within the U.S. state of Kansas
- Country: United States
- State: Kansas
- Founded: August 25, 1855
- Named for: Joseph C. Anderson
- Seat: Garnett
- Largest city: Garnett

Area
  - Total: 584 sq mi (1,510 km^{2})
  - Land: 580 sq mi (1,500 km^{2})
  - Water: 7.1 sq mi (18 km^{2}) 0.7%

Population (2020)
  - Total: 7,836
  - Estimate (2025): 8,018 ▲
  - Density: 14/sq mi (5.2/km^{2})
- Time zone: UTC−6 (Central)
  - Summer (DST): UTC−5 (CDT)
- Area code: 785
- Congressional district: 3rd
- Website: AndersonCountyKS.org

Anderson County is a county located in East Central Kansas, in the Central United States. Its county seat and most populous city is Garnett. As of the 2020 census, the county population was 7,836. The county was named for Joseph C. Anderson, a Kansas territorial legislator and border ruffian during the "Bleeding Kansas" era.

== History ==
In 1854, the Kansas Territory was organized, and in 1855, Anderson County was established as one of the original 33 counties of the Kansas Territory, named for territorial legislator Joseph C. Anderson. The initial settlement began in 1854 with individuals such as Valentine Gerth and Francis Meyer staking claims near what would become Greeley. The settlers discovered fields previously worked by the Potawatomi, who had been relocated there in 1833. The early years were fraught with conflict during "Bleeding Kansas," with Anderson County men engaging in battles such as that at Osawatomie, where the clash over slavery was intense.

The county's administrative center was initially established at Shannon, but disputes over the location of the county seat resulted in its move to Garnett in 1859, where it has remained. The agrarian economy suffered from natural disasters, including the severe drought of 1860, which left the county in distress. Subsequent years brought the infamous grasshopper plagues of 1874–1875, which devastated crops, yet the resolve of the settlers saw them through these hardships. The introduction of wheat farming helped stabilize the region.

In 1861 Kansas became the 34th U.S. state. The Civil War period saw Anderson County's men volunteer for Union forces, with the war also temporarily halting the cattle drives from Texas that had introduced Spanish fever to the local cattle. Post-war, the county experienced a resurgence in agricultural development, with the arrival of the railroad playing a crucial role in economic growth by opening up markets. As Anderson County moved towards the 20th century, its economy was based on farming, with some coal mining activities due to local deposits. The onset of World War I saw the community rallying to support the war effort, with many local men enlisting for service overseas. This era marked the beginning of a transition period, where traditional farming practices would soon give way to technological advancements in agriculture.

In 1884, the first photograph of a tornado was taken in Anderson County.

== Geography ==
According to the U.S. Census Bureau, the county has a total area of 584 square miles (1,510 km^{2}), of which 580 square miles (1,500 km^{2}) is land and 4.1 square miles (11 km^{2}) (0.7%) is water.

=== Adjacent counties ===
- Franklin County (north)
- Miami County (northeast)
- Linn County (east)
- Bourbon County (southeast)
- Allen County (south)
- Woodson County (southwest)
- Coffey County (west)

=== Major highways ===
Sources: National Atlas, U.S. Census Bureau

- U.S. Route 59
- U.S. Route 169
- Kansas Highway 31
- Kansas Highway 52
- Kansas Highway 58

== Demographics ==
Historical population
Census	Pop.	Note	%±
1860	2,400		—
1870	5,220		117.5%
1880	9,057		73.5%
1890	14,203		56.8%
1900	13,938		−1.9%
1910	13,829		−0.8%
1920	12,986		−6.1%
1930	13,355		2.8%
1940	11,658		−12.7%
1950	10,267		−11.9%
1960	9,035		−12.0%
1970	8,501		−5.9%
1980	8,749		2.9%
1990	7,803		−10.8%
2000	8,110		3.9%
2010	8,102		−0.1%
2020	7,836		−3.3%
2025 (est.)	8,018	▲	2.3%
U.S. Decennial Census; 1790-1960 1900-1990; 1990-2000 2010-2020

=== 2020 census ===
As of the 2020 census, the county had a population of 7,836. The median age was 42.0 years. 25.6% of residents were under the age of 18 and 21.3% of residents were 65 years of age or older. For every 100 females there were 99.8 males, and for every 100 females age 18 and over there were 98.3 males age 18 and over. 0.0% of residents lived in urban areas, while 100.0% lived in rural areas.

The racial makeup of the county was 93.3% White, 0.3% Black or African American, 0.7% American Indian and Alaska Native, 0.6% Asian, 0.0% Native Hawaiian and Pacific Islander, 0.8% from some other race, and 4.2% from two or more races. Hispanic or Latino residents of any race comprised 2.0% of the population.

There were 3,108 households in the county, of which 30.7% had children under the age of 18 living with them and 22.7% had a female householder with no spouse or partner present. About 29.5% of all households were made up of individuals and 14.9% had someone living alone who was 65 years of age or older.

There were 3,556 housing units, of which 12.6% were vacant. Among occupied housing units, 76.9% were owner-occupied and 23.1% were renter-occupied. The homeowner vacancy rate was 3.1% and the rental vacancy rate was 8.0%.

=== 2000 census ===
As of the 2000 census, there were 8,110 people, 3,221 households, and 2,264 families residing in the county. The population density was 14 people per square mile (5.4 people/km^{2}). There were 3,596 housing units at an average density of 6 units per square mile (2.3 units/km^{2}). The racial makeup of the county was 97.41% White, 0.32% Black or African American, 0.74% Native American, 0.22% Asian, 0.02% Pacific Islander, 0.33% from other races, and 0.95% from two or more races. Hispanic or Latino of any race were 1.09% of the population. 35.0% were of German, 20.4% American, 10.4% English and 9.9% Irish ancestry.

There were 3,221 households, out of which 31.00% had children under the age of 18 living with them, 59.90% were married couples living together, 6.90% had a female householder with no husband present, and 29.70% were non-families. 26.80% of all households were made up of individuals, and 15.60% had someone living alone who was 65 years of age or older. The average household size was 2.48 and the average family size was 3.00.

In the county, the population was spread out, with 26.20% under the age of 18, 7.00% from 18 to 24, 24.60% from 25 to 44, 22.10% from 45 to 64, and 20.00% who were 65 years of age or older. The median age was 40 years. For every 100 females there were 96.70 males. For every 100 females age 18 and over, there were 93.50 males.

The median income for a household in the county was $33,244, and the median income for a family was $39,101. Males had a median income of $30,102 versus $20,705 for females. The per capita income for the county was $16,458. About 10.60% of families and 12.80% of the population were below the poverty line, including 16.30% of those under age 18 and 11.00% of those age 65 or over.

== Government ==
Presidential election results

United States presidential election results for Anderson County, Kansas
Year	Republican		Democratic		Third party(ies)	
Year	No.	%	No.	%	No.	%
1888	1,843	55.13%	960	28.72%	540	16.15%
1892	1,638	51.06%	0	0.00%	1,570	48.94%
1896	1,780	47.57%	1,890	50.51%	72	1.92%
1900	1,846	50.40%	1,757	47.97%	60	1.64%
1904	1,891	58.26%	1,043	32.13%	312	9.61%
1908	1,722	51.25%	1,512	45.00%	126	3.75%
1912	618	19.88%	1,365	43.92%	1,125	36.20%
1916	2,386	43.95%	2,739	50.45%	304	5.60%
1920	3,068	62.82%	1,708	34.97%	108	2.21%
1924	3,101	60.98%	1,421	27.94%	563	11.07%
1928	3,562	64.94%	1,874	34.17%	49	0.89%
1932	2,408	39.63%	3,580	58.92%	88	1.45%
1936	3,452	54.64%	2,767	43.80%	99	1.57%
1940	3,886	64.41%	2,114	35.04%	33	0.55%
1944	3,060	64.89%	1,649	34.97%	7	0.15%
1948	2,787	56.85%	2,071	42.25%	44	0.90%
1952	3,672	73.18%	1,333	26.56%	13	0.26%
1956	3,080	69.01%	1,369	30.67%	14	0.31%
1960	2,665	62.35%	1,589	37.18%	20	0.47%
1964	1,692	44.76%	2,058	54.44%	30	0.79%
1968	2,168	56.84%	1,242	32.56%	404	10.59%
1972	2,718	70.86%	1,035	26.98%	83	2.16%
1976	1,872	48.70%	1,886	49.06%	86	2.24%
1980	2,363	62.63%	1,170	31.01%	240	6.36%
1984	2,462	67.14%	1,155	31.50%	50	1.36%
1988	1,781	54.25%	1,466	44.65%	36	1.10%
1992	1,218	33.03%	1,178	31.95%	1,291	35.01%
1996	1,636	46.66%	1,367	38.99%	503	14.35%
2000	1,984	57.04%	1,327	38.15%	167	4.80%
2004	2,500	64.72%	1,295	33.52%	68	1.76%
2008	2,362	65.14%	1,175	32.40%	89	2.45%
2012	2,276	68.66%	944	28.48%	95	2.87%
2016	2,435	72.69%	672	20.06%	243	7.25%
2020	2,929	77.24%	782	20.62%	81	2.14%
2024	2,998	79.08%	732	19.31%	61	1.61%

Anderson County has, in common with other rural areas of Kansas, voted predominantly Republican in presidential elections, with the last Democratic candidate to carry the county being Jimmy Carter in 1976.

=== Laws ===
Following amendment to the Kansas Constitution in 1986, the county remained a prohibition, or "dry", county until 1996, when voters approved the sale of alcoholic liquor by the individual drink with a 30 percent food sales requirement.

== Education ==
=== Unified school districts ===
- Garnett USD 365
- Crest USD 479

== Communities ==
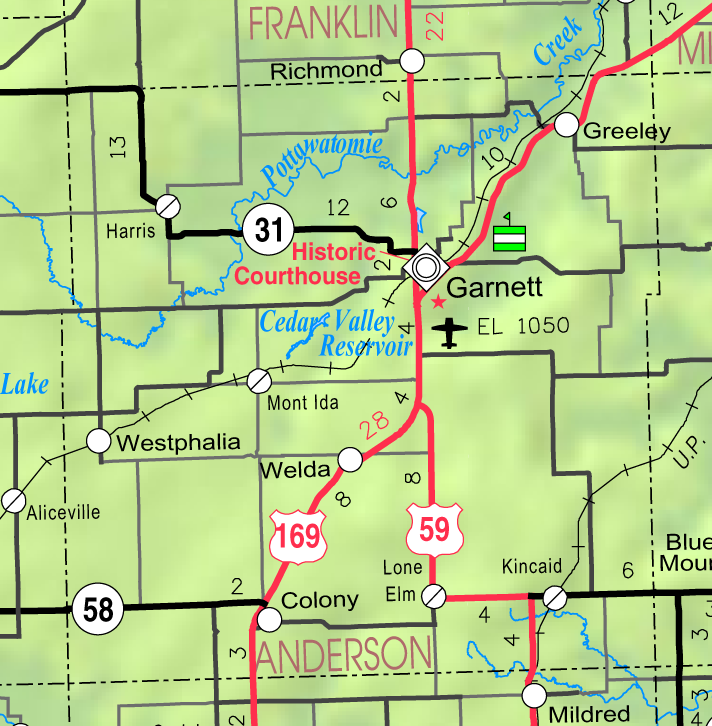
2005 map of Anderson County (map legend)

List of townships / incorporated cities / unincorporated communities / extinct former communities within Anderson County.

=== Cities ===
- Colony
- Garnett (county seat)
- Greeley
- Kincaid
- Lone Elm
- Westphalia

=== Unincorporated communities ===
† means a community is designated a Census-Designated Place (CDP) by the United States Census Bureau.

- Bush City
- Glenlock
- Harris†
- Mont Ida†
- Scipio
- Selma
- Welda†

=== Ghost towns ===
- Hyattville

=== Townships ===
Anderson County is divided into fourteen townships. The city of Garnett is considered governmentally independent and is excluded from the census figures for the townships. In the following table, the population center is the largest city (or cities) included in that township's population total, if it is of a significant size.

Township	FIPS	Population center	Population	Population density /km^{2} (/sq mi)	Land area km^{2} (sq mi)	Water area km^{2} (sq mi)	Water %	Geographic coordinates
Indian Creek	34050		132	1 (3)	125 (48)	0 (0)	0.07%	38°5′21″N 95°27′33″W
Jackson	34725		453	5 (13)	88 (34)	0 (0)	0.06%	38°17′44″N 95°17′48″W
Lincoln	40475		208	2 (4)	128 (49)	0 (0)	0.22%	38°12′42″N 95°8′42″W
Lone Elm	42450		239	2 (5)	120 (46)	0 (0)	0.21%	38°4′56″N 95°14′30″W
Monroe	47725		349	5 (12)	74 (29)	0 (0)	0.11%	38°17′44″N 95°12′54″W
North Rich	51325		112	2 (5)	62 (24)	0 (0)	0.06%	38°8′10″N 95°7′24″W
Ozark	53900	Colony	565	6 (16)	93 (36)	0 (0)	0.07%	38°4′24″N 95°21′37″W
Putnam	58000		284	3 (8)	87 (34)	0 (0)	0.11%	38°21′41″N 95°16′4″W
Reeder	58825		427	2 (6)	187 (72)	1 (0)	0.44%	38°19′14″N 95°26′6″W
Rich	59175	Kincaid	346	4 (11)	78 (30)	0 (0)	0.21%	38°4′48″N 95°8′58″W
Walker	74650	Greeley	668	6 (15)	117 (45)	0 (0)	0.38%	38°21′4″N 95°6′47″W
Washington	75500		268	3 (7)	93 (36)	0 (0)	0.19%	38°13′47″N 95°17′5″W
Welda	76450		301	3 (7)	116 (45)	0 (0)	0.22%	38°9′44″N 95°19′17″W
Westphalia	77275	Westphalia	390	3 (8)	134 (52)	1 (0)	0.38%	38°11′56″N 95°27′46″W
Sources: "Census 2000 U.S. Gazetteer Files". U.S. Census Bureau, Geography Division. Archived from the original on August 2, 2002.

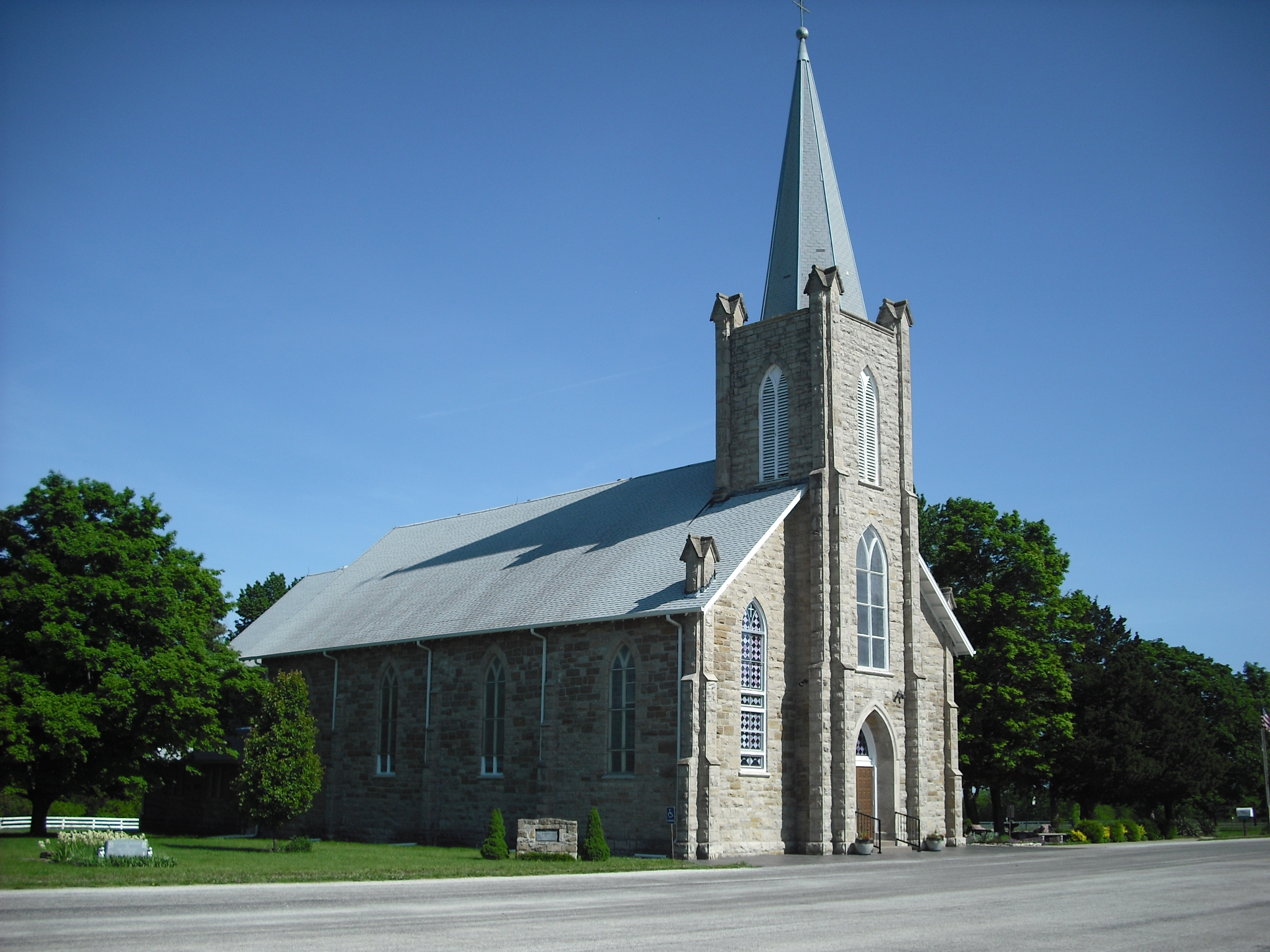
St. Boniface Catholic Church in Scipio

== Media ==
Anderson County Review is a weekly newspaper.

== See also ==
Community information for Kansas

- Kansas locations by per capita income
- List of counties in Kansas
- List of townships in Kansas
- List of cities in Kansas
- List of unincorporated communities in Kansas
- List of ghost towns in Kansas
- National Register of Historic Places listings in Anderson County, Kansas
