= Jackson Township, Anderson County, Kansas =

Jackson Township
- Township
- Location in Anderson County
- Coordinates: 38°18′35″N 095°18′16″W
- Country: United States
- State: Kansas
- County: Anderson

Area
  - Total: 34.1 sq mi (88.2 km^{2})
  - Land: 33.9 sq mi (87.7 km^{2})
  - Water: 0.19 sq mi (0.5 km^{2}) 0.60%
- Elevation: 1,020 ft (311 m)

Population (2010)
  - Total: 459
  - Density: 13/sq mi (5.2/km^{2})
- GNIS feature ID: 0477667

Jackson Township is a township in Anderson County, Kansas, United States. As of the 2010 census, its population was 459.

== History ==
Jackson Township was established in 1857.

== Geography ==
Jackson Township covers an area of 34.1 square miles (88.2 km^{2}) and contains no incorporated settlements, though the county seat of Garnett sits on the township's eastern border with Monroe Township. According to the USGS, it contains two cemeteries: Amish and Pleasantville.

The streams of Cedar Creek, Fish Creek, Iantha Creek and Sac Creek run through this township.
