= Joseph C. Anderson =

American politician

Joseph Campbell Anderson (c. 1830 – 1891) was a member of the Kansas Territorial Legislature and the namesake of Anderson County, Kansas.

== Biography ==
Anderson was born in about 1830 in Jessamine County, Kentucky, to businessman and hemp grower Oliver Anderson. They moved to Lexington, Missouri in 1850 where Joseph and his brother William (not to be confused with guerilla leader William T. Anderson) established a law practice. In 1855, Anderson was elected to the so-called "Bogus Legislature", the first Kansas territorial legislature, from the 6th district, so named because of its disproportionate number of pro-slavery legislators over Free Staters. Known as Border Ruffians, several thousand men relocated from Missouri to Kansas in order to elect pro-slavery candidates; Anderson was among them although he retained his main residence in Lexington while officially residing in Fort Scott. He was elected Speaker Pro Tempore of the legislature.

Anderson was a staunch supporter of slavery, and was the architect of several pro-slavery laws during the territory's existence. During the Kansas Border War, Anderson worked as a lawyer in Kansas. He was a founder of the Law and Order Party in Leavenworth in October 1855.

During the American Civil War in 1862, Joseph and William Anderson and their father were arrested and imprisoned "for refusing to sign an 'oath of allegiance' to the Union." Following their release, they moved back to Kentucky and Joseph continued as a lawyer. The two brothers were also reportedly members of a secret militant group "Southern League", which smuggled weapons south to the Confederacy. For this the two brothers were imprisoned.
