= Washington Township, Anderson County, Kansas =

Washington Township
- Township
- Location in Anderson County
- Coordinates: 38°13′40″N 095°18′21″W
- Country: United States
- State: Kansas
- County: Anderson

Area
  - Total: 36.0 sq mi (93.2 km^{2})
  - Land: 35.3 sq mi (91.4 km^{2})
  - Water: 0.69 sq mi (1.8 km^{2}) 1.96%
- Elevation: 1,093 ft (333 m)

Population (2010)
  - Total: 272
  - Density: 7.8/sq mi (3/km^{2})
- GNIS feature ID: 0477666

Washington Township is a township in Anderson County, Kansas, United States. As of the 2010 census, its population was 272.

== History ==
Washington Township was established in 1857.

== Geography ==
Washington Township covers an area of 36.0 square miles (93.2 km^{2}) and contains no incorporated settlements. According to the USGS, it contains five cemeteries: Baptist, Horn, Hyatt, Mont Ida and Springfield.

The streams of Bradshaw Creek and Skunk Branch run through this township.

== Communities ==
It contains the census-designated place of Mont Ida.
