= Indian Creek Township, Kansas =

Indian Creek Township
- Township
- Location in Anderson County
- Coordinates: 38°05′47″N 095°27′49″W
- Country: United States
- State: Kansas
- County: Anderson

Area
  - Total: 48.3 sq mi (125.2 km^{2})
  - Land: 48.1 sq mi (124.6 km^{2})
  - Water: 0.23 sq mi (0.6 km^{2}) 0.48%
- Elevation: 1,050 ft (320 m)

Population (2010)
  - Total: 127
  - Density: 2.6/sq mi (1/km^{2})
- GNIS feature ID: 0478109

Indian Creek Township is a township in Anderson County, Kansas, United States. As of the 2010 census, its population was 127.

== History ==
Indian Creek Township was established in 1873.

== Geography ==
Indian Creek Township covers an area of 48.3 square miles (125.2 km^{2}) and contains no incorporated settlements.

The stream of Little Indian Creek runs through this township.
