= Hyattville, Kansas =

Ghost town in Anderson County, Kansas

- Ghost town
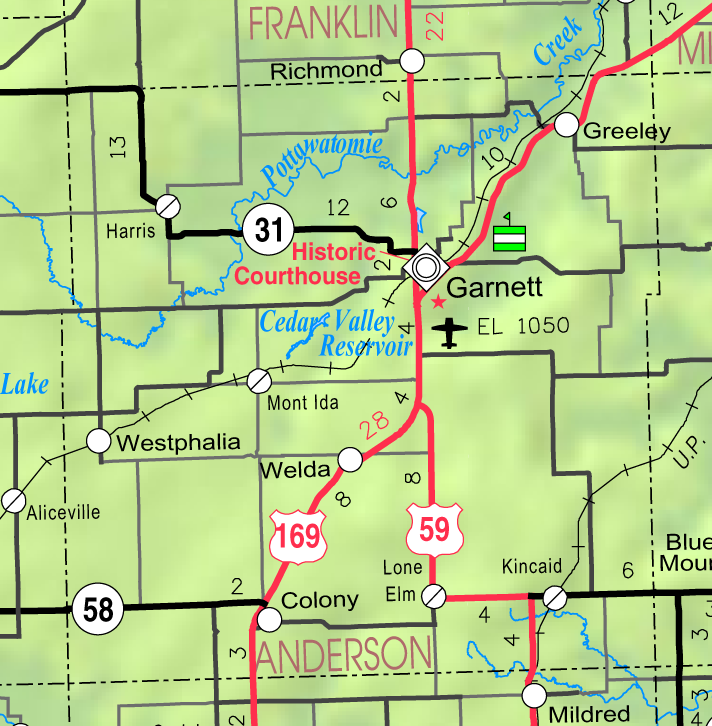
- KDOT map of Anderson County (legend)

- Location within Kansas Location within the United States
- Coordinates: 38°13′38″N 95°17′50″W
- Country: United States
- State: Kansas
- County: Anderson
- Elevation: 1,112 ft (339 m)

Population
  - Total: 0
- Time zone: UTC-6 (CST)
  - Summer (DST): UTC-5 (CDT)
- Area code: 620
- GNIS ID: 482390

Hyattville is a ghost town in Anderson County, Kansas, United States.

== History ==
A town called Hyatt in Anderson County had a post office from 1857 until 1867. It was named for Thaddeus Hyatt, who, along with William F.M. Arny, were joined by pro-slavery Captain James A. Harvey and around 80 of his men; they had been stationed near Lawrence, but they needed a place to form a colony after they had been mustered out of service. Many of Hyattville's buildings, including a hotel, a store, and a blacksmith shop, were made of timber cut down during the winter of 1856. In the spring of 1857, a sawmill, probably the first in the county, was constructed, and that fall, a gristmill was attached to the sawmill. Throughout the year, a school, city park, and a stage and wagon shop were also constructed. That same year, a company of cavalry was ordered sent to the town to preserve order during elections^{:305}. Following an epidemic in 1857 and the selection of Garnett as county seat in 1859, however, residents began leaving Hyattville, many of them for western Kansas during the Pike's Peak Gold Rush.

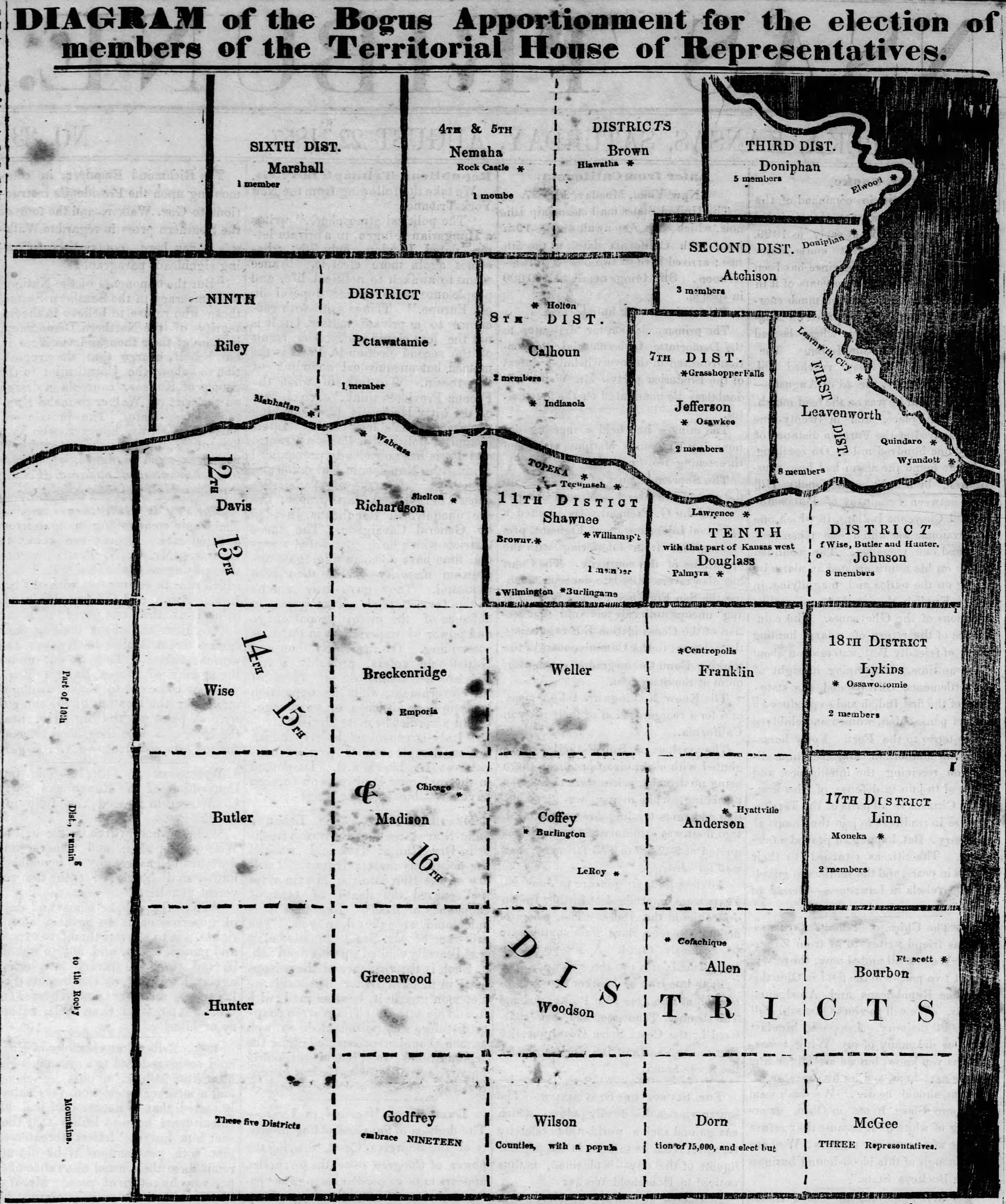
Hyattville on Territorial Kansas map
