= Monroe Township, Kansas =

Monroe Township
- Township
- Location in Anderson County
- Coordinates: 38°18′10″N 095°12′11″W
- Country: United States
- State: Kansas
- County: Anderson

Area
  - Total: 28.6 sq mi (74.0 km^{2})
  - Land: 28.4 sq mi (73.6 km^{2})
  - Water: 0.12 sq mi (0.3 km^{2}) 0.46%
- Elevation: 1,024 ft (312 m)

Population (2010)
  - Total: 349
  - Density: 12/sq mi (4.7/km^{2})
- GNIS feature ID: 0477653

Monroe Township is a township in Anderson County, Kansas, United States. As of the 2010 census, its population was 349.

== History ==
Monroe Township was established in 1857.

== Geography ==
Monroe Township covers an area of 28.6 square miles (74.0 km^{2}) and contains no incorporated settlements. The county seat of Garnett, administratively separate from the township, occupies an area along the western border with Jackson Township. According to the USGS, it contains two cemeteries: Garnett and Judy.
