= Ozark Township, Kansas =

Ozark Township
- Township
- Location in Anderson County
- Coordinates: 38°04′55″N 095°20′41″W
- Country: United States
- State: Kansas
- County: Anderson

Area
  - Total: 35.9 sq mi (92.9 km^{2})
  - Land: 35.6 sq mi (92.3 km^{2})
  - Water: 0.23 sq mi (0.6 km^{2}) 0.68%
- Elevation: 1,096 ft (334 m)

Population (2010)
  - Total: 578
  - Density: 16/sq mi (6.3/km^{2})
- GNIS feature ID: 0478121

Ozark Township is a township in Anderson County, Kansas, United States. As of the 2010 census, its population was 578.

== History ==
Ozark Township was established in 1859.

== Geography ==
Ozark Township covers an area of 35.9 square miles (92.9 km^{2}) and contains one incorporated settlement, Colony.
