= Kincaid, Kansas =

City in Anderson County, Kansas

- City
- Location within Anderson County and Kansas

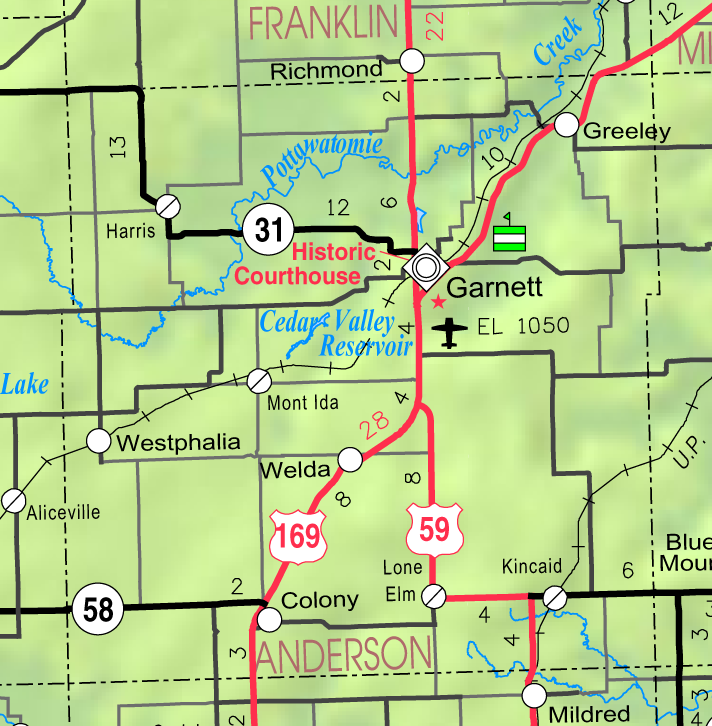
- KDOT map of Anderson County (legend)
- Coordinates: 38°04′53″N 95°09′19″W
- Country: United States
- State: Kansas
- County: Anderson
- Township: Rich
- Founded: 1885
- Incorporated: 1886
- Named for: Robert Kincaid

Government
  - Mayor: Cristin Fuller

Area
  - Total: 0.50 sq mi (1.30 km^{2})
  - Land: 0.50 sq mi (1.30 km^{2})
  - Water: 0 sq mi (0.00 km^{2})
- Elevation: 1,043 ft (318 m)

Population (2020)
  - Total: 103
  - Density: 205/sq mi (79.2/km^{2})
- Time zone: UTC-6 (CST)
  - Summer (DST): UTC-5 (CDT)
- ZIP Code: 66039
- Area code: 620
- FIPS code: 20-36875
- GNIS ID: 2395535

Kincaid is a city in Rich Township, Anderson County, Kansas, United States. As of the 2020 census, the population of the city was 103.

== History ==
Kincaid was founded in 1885. It was named for Robert Kincaid, of Mound City.

== Geography ==
According to the United States Census Bureau, the city has a total area of 0.50 square miles (1.29 km^{2}), all land.

== Demographics ==
Historical population
Census	Pop.	Note	%±
1890	284		—
1900	364		28.2%
1910	426		17.0%
1920	443		4.0%
1930	380		−14.2%
1940	401		5.5%
1950	309		−22.9%
1960	220		−28.8%
1970	189		−14.1%
1980	192		1.6%
1990	170		−11.5%
2000	178		4.7%
2010	122		−31.5%
2020	103		−15.6%
U.S. Decennial Census

=== 2020 census ===
The 2020 United States census counted 103 people, 46 households, and 28 families in Kincaid. The population density was 206.0 per square mile (79.5/km^{2}). There were 73 housing units at an average density of 146.0 per square mile (56.4/km^{2}). The racial makeup was 91.26% (94) white or European American (91.26% non-Hispanic white), 2.91% (3) black or African-American, 0.97% (1) Native American or Alaska Native, 0.0% (0) Asian, 0.0% (0) Pacific Islander or Native Hawaiian, 0.0% (0) from other races, and 4.85% (5) from two or more races. Hispanic or Latino of any race was 0.0% (0) of the population.

Of the 46 households, 34.8% had children under the age of 18; 37.0% were married couples living together; 37.0% had a female householder with no spouse or partner present. 37.0% of households consisted of individuals and 6.5% had someone living alone who was 65 years of age or older. The average household size was 2.6 and the average family size was 2.9. The percent of those with a bachelor's degree or higher was estimated to be 2.9% of the population.

24.3% of the population was under the age of 18, 6.8% from 18 to 24, 23.3% from 25 to 44, 33.0% from 45 to 64, and 12.6% who were 65 years of age or older. The median age was 42.3 years. For every 100 females, there were 74.6 males. For every 100 females ages 18 and older, there were 90.2 males.

The 2016–2020 5-year American Community Survey estimates show that the median household income was $41,250 (with a margin of error of +/- $23,657) and the median family income was $51,250 (+/- $3,375). Males had a median income of $23,438 (+/- $21,393) versus $27,750 (+/- $8,483) for females. The median income for those above 16 years old was $24,286 (+/- $6,222). Approximately, 18.8% of families and 29.3% of the population were below the poverty line, including 37.5% of those under the age of 18 and 28.6% of those ages 65 or over.

=== 2010 census ===
As of the census of 2010, there were 122 people, 56 households, and 30 families residing in the city. The population density was 244.0 inhabitants per square mile (94.2/km^{2}). There were 95 housing units at an average density of 190.0 per square mile (73.4/km^{2}). The racial makeup of the city was 96.7% White, 0.8% Native American, 0.8% Asian, and 1.6% from two or more races. Hispanic or Latino of any race were 1.6% of the population.

There were 56 households, of which 28.6% had children under the age of 18 living with them, 41.1% were married couples living together, 8.9% had a female householder with no husband present, 3.6% had a male householder with no wife present, and 46.4% were non-families. 41.1% of all households were made up of individuals, and 16.1% had someone living alone who was 65 years of age or older. The average household size was 2.18 and the average family size was 3.00.

The median age in the city was 48.3 years. 19.7% of residents were under the age of 18; 9% were between the ages of 18 and 24; 14.8% were from 25 to 44; 35.2% were from 45 to 64; and 21.3% were 65 years of age or older. The gender makeup of the city was 52.5% male and 47.5% female.

=== 2000 census ===
As of the census of 2000, there were 178 people, 73 households, and 41 families residing in the city. The population density was 354.9 inhabitants per square mile (137.0/km^{2}). There were 92 housing units at an average density of 183.4 per square mile (70.8/km^{2}). The racial makeup of the city was 94.38% White, 4.49% Native American, 1.12% from other races. Hispanic or Latino of any race were 2.81% of the population.

There were 73 households, out of which 24.7% had children under the age of 18 living with them, 42.5% were married couples living together, 11.0% had a female householder with no husband present, and 43.8% were non-families. 39.7% of all households were made up of individuals, and 23.3% had someone living alone who was 65 years of age or older. The average household size was 2.44 and the average family size was 3.34.

In the city, the population was spread out, with 23.0% under the age of 18, 7.9% from 18 to 24, 23.0% from 25 to 44, 23.6% from 45 to 64, and 22.5% who were 65 years of age or older. The median age was 43 years. For every 100 females, there were 111.9 males. For every 100 females age 18 and over, there were 107.6 males.

The median income for a household in the city was $22,857, and the median income for a family was $29,375. Males had a median income of $20,694 versus $14,500 for females. The per capita income for the city was $9,472. About 7.0% of families and 11.1% of the population were below the poverty line, including none of those under the age of eighteen and 4.9% of those 65 or over.

== Area events ==
The Kincaid Fair is an annual three-day event. It originally was first held in 1908.

== Government ==
The Kincaid consists of a mayor and five council members. The council meets the second Monday of each month at 7PM.

- City Hall, 500 5th Ave.

== Education ==
Kincaid is part of Unified School District 479. The district high school is Crest High School. Kincaid Rural High School was closed in 1967 through unification. The mascot was the Blue Devils.

== See also ==
- List of Grand Army of the Republic posts in Kansas
