= Frank Reeder =

American politician and military officer (1845–1912)

Secretary of the Commonwealth of Pennsylvania
- In office 1895–1897
- Governor: Daniel H. Hastings
- Preceded by: William F. Harrity
- Succeeded by: David Martin

Personal details
- Born: May 22, 1845 Easton, Pennsylvania
- Died: December 7, 1912 (aged 67) Easton, Pennsylvania
- Party: Republican
- Parent(s): Andrew Horatio Reeder and Frederika Amalia (Hutter) Reeder
- Education: Albany Law School

Frank Reeder (May 22, 1845 – December 7, 1912) was an American politician and military officer who was chairman of the Pennsylvania Republican state committee from 1892 to 1893 and 1899 to 1902 and Secretary of the Commonwealth of Pennsylvania from 1895 to 1897.

== Early life and military service ==
Reeder was born on May 22, 1845 in Easton, Pennsylvania. He was the son of Andrew Horatio Reeder, the first Territorial Governor of Kansas. He attended the Lawrenceville Academy and Princeton University, but left the latter institution to join the Union Army.

Reeder enlisted as private in the 5th Pennsylvania Reserve Regiment in September 1862. Later that year, he joined the 174th Pennsylvania Regiment and was its adjutant until its term expired in August 1893. Reeder assisted in recruiting the 19th Pennsylvania Cavalry Regiment and was made the captain of one of its companies. He was wounded during the Battle of Nashville and was discharged with the rank of lieutenant colonel on June 6, 1865.

Reeder graduated from Albany Law School in 1868 was admitted to the New York bar that March. He had an office with J. K. Porter and later practiced with Chester A. Arthur. In 1870, he returned to Easton and entered a partnership with his brother, Howard J. Reeder. In 1872, Reeder was elected department commander of the Grand Army of the Republic of Pennsylvania. From 1874 to 1881, he was a brigadier general in the Pennsylvania National Guard.

== Politics ==
From 1873 to 1877, Reeder was collector of revenue for the 11th district of Pennsylvania. He was a delegate to the 1888, 1892, 1896, 1900, and 1904 Republican National Conventions and was a convention vice-president in 1896.

On May 17, 1892, Reeder was elected chairman of the Republican state committee after the incumbent, Louis Arthur Watres, declined to serve another term. In 1893, he was the Republican nominee in the special election to fill Pennsylvania's 8th congressional district seat following the death of William Mutchler. Reeder, who was in New York City when the nomination occurred, did not want to run, but agreed to because it was too late to secure another Republican candidate. Reeder lost to the Democratic candidate, Howard Mutchler, by about 2,800 votes.

In 1895, Reeder was appointed Secretary of the Commonwealth by Governor Daniel H. Hastings. On September 8, 1897, it was announced that Hastings has requested, and received, Reeder's resignation following a report in The Philadelphia Press that Reeder and Deputy Attorney General John P. Elkin had signed a bond for an appropriation that had been approved by the legislature, but not signed by the Governor. The firings were seen as politically motived maneuverings by Hastings against intraparty rival Matthew Quay. Hastings successor, William A. Stone, planned to make Reeder his Secretary of the Commonwealth in an effort to vindicate him, but Reeder declined so that the position could go to William W. Griest in exchange for his support for Quay's reelection to the United States Senate. On August 24, 1899, Reeder was once again elected chairman of the state committee. In October 1900, he was appointed state banking commissioner by Stone. In 1902, he was offered a judgeship on the Superior Court of Pennsylvania, but he did not have judicial aspirations and declined.

Reeder was succeeded as party chairman by Quay in 1902 and stepped down as banking commissioner the following year. He died on December 7, 1912 at his home in Easton.
