= Dean Brooks =

American physician and actor (1916–2013)

- Born: July 22, 1916; Colony, Kansas, U.S.
- Died: May 30, 2013 (aged 96); Salem, Oregon, U.S.
- Education: University of Kansas
- Occupations: Physician; Actor

Dean Kent Brooks (July 22, 1916 – May 30, 2013) was an American physician and actor. Brooks was the superintendent of Oregon State Hospital for 27 years from 1955 to 1982. He was born in Colony, Kansas.

== Life and career ==
Dean Brooks graduated from the University of Kansas with a bachelor's degree and the University of Kansas Medical School in Kansas City, Kansas in 1942. During college and medical school, he was an accomplished trombonist and played in nightclubs with some of the most well-known big band performers in the country. He joined the U.S. Navy in 1943 and became a naval medical officer during World War II assigned to Landing Ship, Tanks and saw battle on seven occasions. In 1955, he became the superintendent of Oregon State Hospital in Salem, Oregon. Brooks was known as a progressive state hospital administrator who established a Superintendent's Committee composed of patients and a study process on dehumanization in which both patients and staff reviewed the state hospital from the perspective of the patients themselves rather than the "purchasing agent". He initiated a psychiatric residency program at Oregon State Hospital which gained accreditation after only two years. An outdoors program successfully integrated staff with patients in hiking and mountaineering trips.

In the 1970s, he granted permission for the film One Flew Over the Cuckoo's Nest (1975) to be shot in the Oregon Hospital, letting the film crew stay at the mental hospital; Brooks also portrayed "Dr. John Spivey" in the film. Dr. Brooks was known for his "patient-centered" approach to caring for the patients at Oregon State Hospital and monitored the treatment of patients by making rounds on every shift.

He was deeply involved in community and church activities locally by founding the Willamette Valley Hospice and developing the Salem Pops Orchestra. After his retirement in 1982, he moved briefly to Santa Fe, New Mexico, and then to Everett, Washington, where he continued his work in mental health advocacy when the Governor of Washington appointed him Chair of the Western Washington State Hospital Governing Board where he served for 12 years. Dr. Brooks was also active with Boards for Snohomish County Mental Health and Compass Health. Because of his strong interests in the criminalization of the mentally ill, he established a fund under the Foundation for Excellence in Mental Health Care to "decriminalize the mentally ill" and recruited many renowned leaders from across the United States in psychiatry, law, journalism and psychology to work as the Dorothea Dix Think Tank.

== Personal life ==
Brooks was married to Ulista Jean Moser, until she died in 2006. Brooks died of natural causes in his Salem, Oregon home, at the age of 96.

== Filmography ==
- One Flew Over the Cuckoo's Nest (1975) as Dr. Spivey
