= Mont Ida, Kansas =

Unincorporated community in Anderson County, Kansas

- CDP
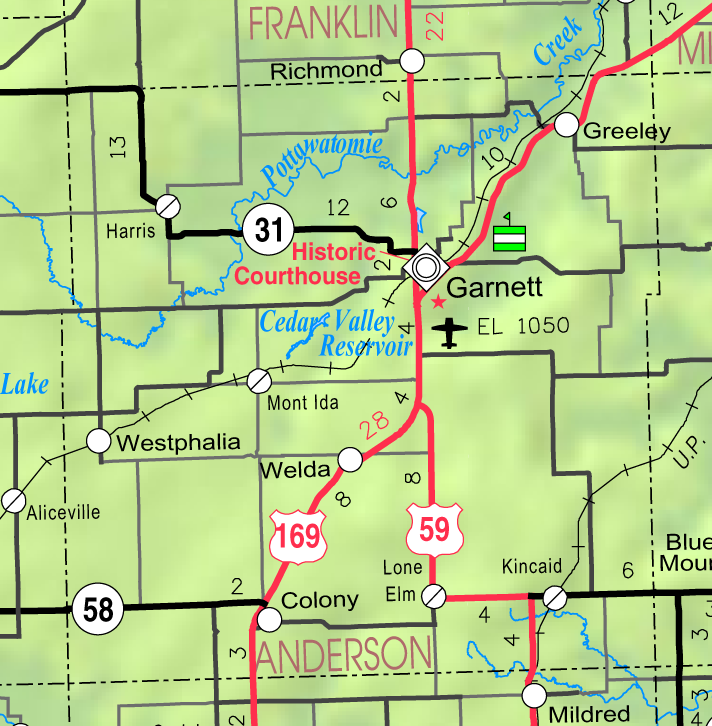
- KDOT map of Anderson County (legend)

- Location within Kansas Location within the United States
- Coordinates: 38°13′01″N 95°21′56″W
- Country: United States
- State: Kansas
- County: Anderson
- Township: Washington
- Founded: 1880
- Elevation: 1,043 ft (318 m)

Population (2020)
  - Total: 23
- Time zone: UTC-6 (CST)
  - Summer (DST): UTC-5 (CDT)
- ZIP Code: 66091
- Area code: 785
- FIPS code: 20-47975
- GNIS ID: 2804476

Mont Ida is a census-designated place (CDP) in Washington Township, Anderson County, Kansas, United States. As of the 2020 census, the population was 23.

== History ==
The railroad's construction across the area around 1880 marked the beginning of Mont Ida.

A post office was opened in Mont Ida in 1880, and remained in operation until it was discontinued in 1944.

== Demographics ==
Historical population
Census	Pop.	Note	%±
2020	23		—
U.S. Decennial Census

=== 2020 census ===
The 2020 United States census counted 23 people, 6 households, and 5 families in Mont Ida. The population density was 96.2 per square mile (37.2/km^{2}). There were 9 housing units at an average density of 37.7 per square mile (14.5/km^{2}). The racial makeup was 100.0% (23) white or European American (100.0% non-Hispanic white), 0.0% (0) black or African-American, 0.0% (0) Native American or Alaska Native, 0.0% (0) Asian, 0.0% (0) Pacific Islander or Native Hawaiian, 0.0% (0) from other races, and 0.0% (0) from two or more races. Hispanic or Latino of any race was 0.0% (0) of the population.

Of the 6 households, 16.7% had children under the age of 18; 83.3% were married couples living together; 0.0% had a female householder with no spouse or partner present. 0.0% of households consisted of individuals and 0.0% had someone living alone who was 65 years of age or older. The average household size was 2.4 and the average family size was 2.4. The percent of those with a bachelor's degree or higher was estimated to be 0.0% of the population.

47.8% of the population was under the age of 18, 0.0% from 18 to 24, 34.8% from 25 to 44, 17.4% from 45 to 64, and 0.0% who were 65 years of age or older. The median age was 28.5 years. For every 100 females, there were 76.9 males. For every 100 females ages 18 and older, there were 50.0 males.
