= Scipio, Kansas =

Unincorporated community in Anderson County, Kansas

Coordinates: 38°22′06″N 95°13′04″W

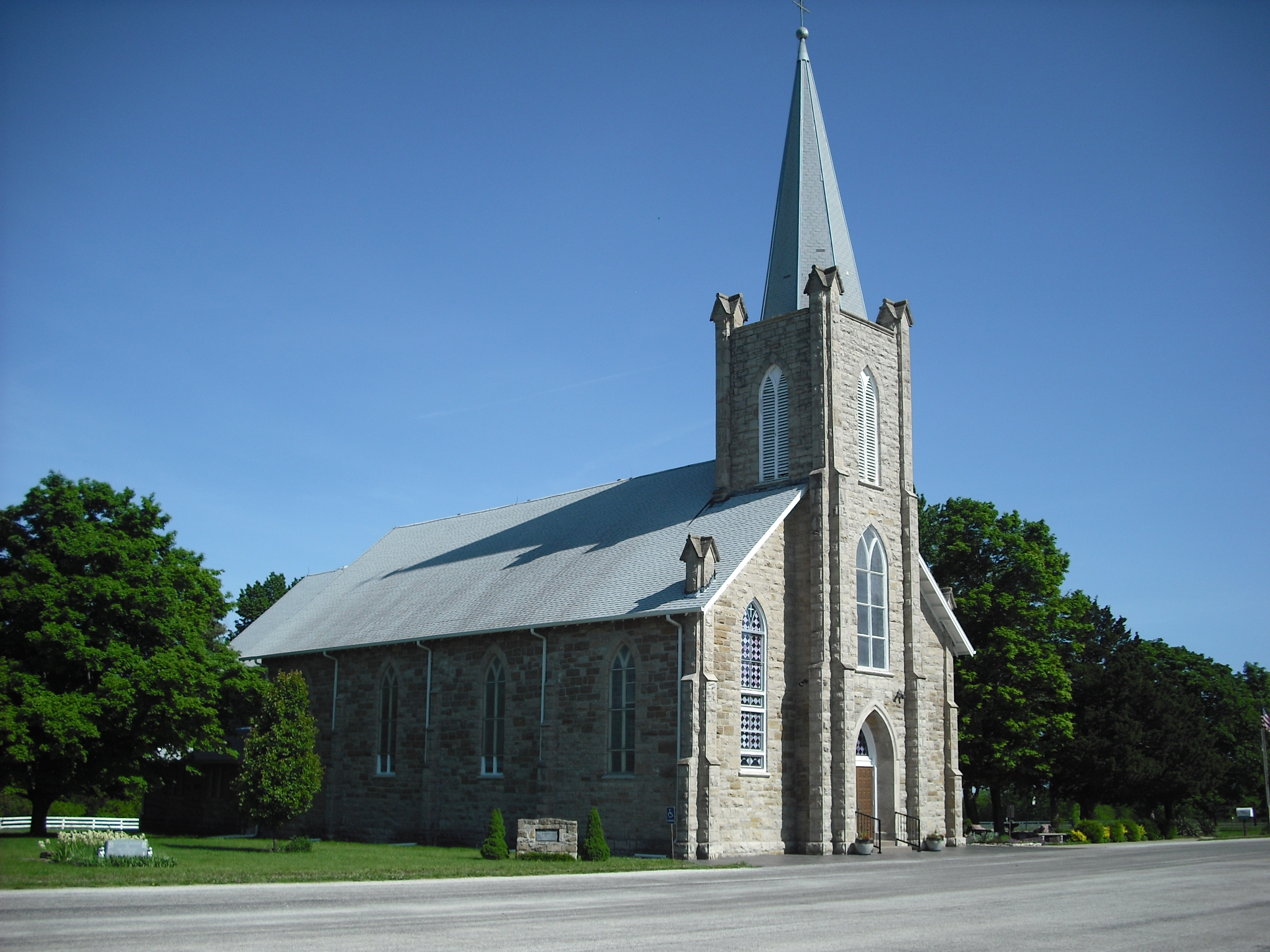
St. Boniface Catholic Church in Scipio (2009)

Scipio is an unincorporated community in Anderson County, Kansas, United States.

== History ==
A post office was opened in Scipio in 1859, and remained in operation until it was discontinued in 1905.

It is home to the St. Boniface Catholic Church, which was constructed in 1891 by German immigrants.
