= Glenloch, Georgia =

- Unincorporated community
- Location within the state of Georgia Glenloch (the United States)
- Coordinates: 33°24′33″N 85°05′10″W
- Country: United States
- State: Georgia
- County: Heard
- Time zone: UTC-5 (Eastern (EST))
  - Summer (DST): UTC-4 (EDT)
- GNIS feature ID: 356035

Glenloch is an unincorporated community in Heard County, in the U.S. state of Georgia.

== History ==
A post office called Glenloch was established in 1886, and remained in operation until 1904. Glenloch is a name derived from Scottish meaning "Glen Lake". The name is sometimes spelled "Glen Loch".
