= Glenlock, Kansas =

Unincorporated community in Anderson County, Kansas

Coordinates: 38°18′36″N 95°20′31″W

Glenlock is an unincorporated community in Anderson County, Kansas, United States.

== History ==
A post office was opened in Glenlock (formerly spelled Glenloch) in 1887, and remained in operation until it was discontinued in 1913.
