= Kansas Legislature =

Legislative branch of the state government of Kansas

Type
- Type: Bicameral
- Houses: Senate; House of Representatives
- Term limits: None

Leadership
- President of the Senate: Ty Masterson (R) since January 14, 2021
- Speaker of the House: Dan Hawkins (R) since January 9, 2023

Structure
- Seats: 165 voting members: 40 senators; 125 representatives
- Senate political groups: Republican (31); Democratic (9)
- House political groups: Republican (88); Democratic (37)
- Length of term: Senate: 4 years House: 2 years

Elections
- Last Senate election: November 5, 2024
- Last House election: November 3, 2026
- Next Senate election: November 7, 2028
- Next House election: November 7, 2028

Meeting place
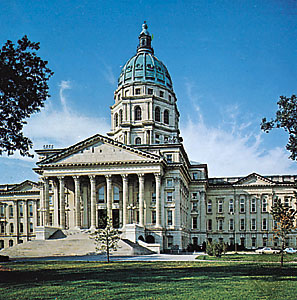
- Kansas State Capitol; Topeka

Website
- Kansas Legislature

Constitution
- Constitution of Kansas

The Kansas Legislature is the state legislature of the U.S. state of Kansas. It is a bicameral assembly, composed of the lower Kansas House of Representatives, with 125 state representatives, and the upper Kansas Senate, with 40 state senators. Representatives are elected for two-year terms, senators for four-year terms.

Prior to statehood, separate pro-slavery and anti-slavery territorial legislatures emerged, drafting four separate constitutions, until one was finally ratified and Kansas became a state in 1861. Republicans hold a long-standing supermajority in both houses of the state legislature, despite a short-lived dominance by the Populist Party.

Composed of 165 state lawmakers, the state legislature meets at the Kansas State Capitol in Topeka once a year in regular session. Additional special sessions can be called by the governor.

== History ==
=== Pre-statehood ===
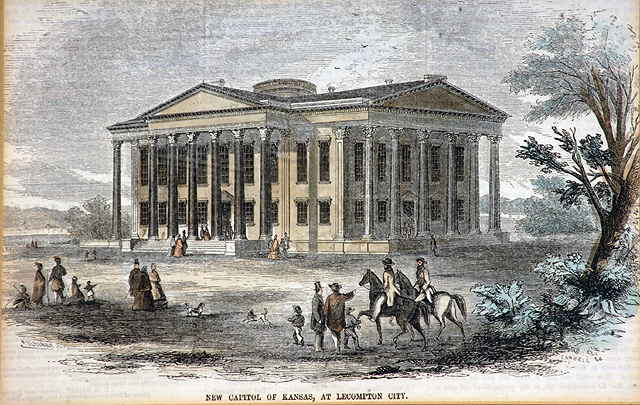
Planned Lecompton, Kansas, state capitol, unbuilt except for foundation

The Kansas Territory was created out of the Kansas–Nebraska Act in 1854. In several of the provisions of the act, the law allowed the settlers of the newly created territory to determine, by vote, whether Kansas, once statehood was achieved, would be entered as either a free or a slave state. The act created a rush of both abolitionist Northern and pro-slavery Southern immigrants to the territory, hoping that strength through numbers would place Kansas in their camp. Animosities between the newly arrived sides quickly turned into open violence and guerrilla warfare, giving name to this period known as Bleeding Kansas.

During Kansas' first elections for a territorial government on March 30, 1855, nearly 5,000 Missouri men, led by United States Senator David Rice Atchison and other prominent pro-slavery Missourians, entered the territory, took over the polling places, and elected pro-slavery candidates. The elections resulted in 12 pro-slavery members of the upper house of the territorial legislature and one free-state member, who resigned before taking his seat; the lower house ended up with 25 pro-slavery members and one free-state member, the latter of whom resigned following the ouster of the other Free-State members. Free-Staters immediately cried foul, naming the new Kansas Territorial Legislature the Bogus Legislature. After meeting for one week in Pawnee at the direction of Territorial Governor Andrew Reeder, the thirty-eight pro-slavery legislators reconvened at the Shawnee Manual Labor School between July 16 and August 30, 1855, and began crafting over a thousand pages of laws aimed at making Kansas a slave state.

Free-Staters convened their own unauthorized shadow legislature and territorial government in Topeka, crafting their own Topeka Constitution in late 1855. While the document was debated and submitted to a vote in the territory, it was never accepted by Congress. The pro-slavery territorial legislature's response to the Free-Staters and growing violence was the Lecompton Constitution in 1857. Due to an electoral boycott by abolitionist groups and the questions regarding the validity of the legislature itself, it never officially became law.

While the Lecompton Constitution was debated, new elections for the territorial legislature in 1857 gave the Free-Staters a majority government, caused in part by a boycott by pro-slavery groups. With this new mandate, the legislature convened to write the Leavenworth Constitution, a radically progressive document for the Victorian era in its wording of rights for women and African Americans. The constitution was adopted in 1858, though it too suffered the same fate as previous documents when Congress refused to ratify it.

Following the Leavenworth Constitution's defeat, the territorial legislature again crafted a new document the following year, dubbed the Wyandotte Constitution. A compromise of sorts, it outlawed slavery in the territory, while removing progressive sections on Native Americans, women, and blacks. The territorial legislature passed the document, and submitted it to public referendum. It was ratified by the Kansas electorate on October 4, 1859.

=== Statehood to present ===
Southern senators blocked the admission of Kansas as a free state, which would have added to the number of free state senators. When they withdrew after seven states seceded, in January 1861, Kansas's admission as a free state, effective January 29, was approved within hours. On February 8, the Confederate States of America was formed.

The first Kansas impeachments occurred in 1862, brought about in part by Republican Party infighting in the state.

The election of state officers under the Wyandotte Constitution took place in December 1859, but because of the delay in approving Kansas's statehood, they did not take their positions until February 1861. The lapse of time created a constitutional question as to the expiration of the two-year terms for which Governor Charles L. Robinson and the chief administrative officers were elected, with Robinson's opponents calling for a November 1861 election. Robinson refused to permit the canvassing of votes for the offices in the 1861 election and his position was upheld by the Kansas Supreme Court.

The state legislature brought impeachment trials against the governor, Kansas Secretary of State J. W. Robinson and State Auditor George S. Hillyer, over what they believed to be the unlawful sale of state bonds to help raise Union troops. They were convicted of selling state bonds in direct violation of the laws of the state, but found innocent of conspiracy and other articles of impeachment. Only three state senators voted to impeach the governor, who was less directly involved in the sale of the bonds.

In 1867, a constitutional amendment was sent to voters to allow women to vote, but failed.

State offices began to move from the Old Constitutional Hall to the east wing of the Kansas State Capitol in 1869, which was still undergoing construction. The state legislature first met there in 1870, though the east wing was not completed until 1873. Work would continue on the building until March 24, 1903.

On February 19, 1881, Kansas became the first state to amend its constitution to prohibit all alcoholic beverages. This action was spawned by the temperance movement, and was enforced by the ax-toting Carrie Nation beginning in 1888. After 1890, prohibition was joined with progressivism to create a reform movement. Kansas did not repeal prohibition until 1948, and even then it continued to prohibit public bars until 1987.

The Populist Party was a significant third party movement in Kansas during the 1890s and peaked in the fall elections of 1892, when the ticket won the governor's office, four congressional seats, and control of the Kansas Senate. Populists and Republicans both claimed control of the Kansas House of Representatives, with the Populists accusing the Republican Party of election fraud. The dispute resulted in separate Populist-led and Republican-led Houses in 1893 that at first shared the chamber but later met in separate locations in the Kansas State Capitol after the Republican-led House took control of the chamber on February 15, 1893. The Kansas Supreme Court eventually sided with the Republicans and the Populist-led House disbanded.

The state legislature was a leader in child labor reform, enacting a law in 1905 to restrict children under 14 from working in factories, meatpacking houses, or mines.

Kansas was a center of the progressive movement, with support from the middle classes, editors such as William Allen White of the Emporia Gazette, and the prohibitionists. With the help of progressive state legislators, women gained the right to vote through a constitutional amendment approved by Kansans on November 5, 1912.

Between 1922 and 1927, there were several legal battles between Kansas and the Ku Klux Klan, resulting in their expulsion from the state.

The Kansas Legislature adopted the flag of Kansas in 1927.

Since 1966, the legislature holds annual general sessions. Previously, the session in odd-numbered years was of unlimited duration while in even-numbered years the session was limited to 60 calendar days (unless two-thirds of the elected members of each house voted to extend it). A constitutional amendment adopted at the 1974 general election extended the duration of the session held in the even-numbered years to 90 calendar days, still subject to extension by a vote of two-thirds of the elected membership of each house.

== Legislative procedure ==
The Kansas Legislature is composed of 165 part-time legislators, meeting normally once a year. Meetings begin on the second Monday in January and last for a period of 90 days during even years. Odd years have no time limit. In general, sessions end in May. The governor of Kansas retains the power to call a special legislative session if needed.

=== Bills ===
A proposed law is introduced in the state legislature as a bill. There are seven basic steps to the life of a bill: the introduction, standing committee action, a vote by the Committee of the Whole, floor passage, action by the second house, action by the governor and publication of the law.

When a bill is introduced its title is read, it is printed and distributed to members of the house of origin, and it is referred to a standing committee. Standing committee chairs decide whether or not to hear a bill and members of the committee can submit amendments to the bill. After consideration and discussion, the committee votes on whether or not to send a committee report to the Committee of the Whole. While under consideration by the Committee of the Whole, amendments can be submitted by state legislators in the house of origin. The final action in the house of origin is a vote by the full membership.

Bills go through an identical process in the opposite house of the state legislature. After passage by both houses, a bill is submitted to the governor, who either signs it into law or vetoes it. If vetoed, the bill only becomes law if both houses of the legislature vote to override the veto with a two-thirds majority of their membership.

=== Legislative Staff Support Agencies ===
The Kansas Legislature is supported by five non-partisan staff support agencies: Legislative Administrative Services, Legislative Division of Post Audit, Kansas Legislative Research Department, Office of the Revisor of Statutes, and Office of Information Services. The offices of the Chief Clerk of the House and the Secretary of the Senate are responsible for the operations of the respective chambers under the direction of elected leadership.

Legislative Administrative Services Legislative Administrative Services provides administrative and technical support for the Kansas Legislature and general public, as directed by the Legislative Coordinating Council.

Legislative Division of Post Audit The Kansas Legislative Division of Post Audit is the non-partisan audit arm of the Kansas Legislature.

Kansas Legislative Research Department KLRD staff members provide nonpartisan, objective research and fiscal analysis for members of the Kansas Legislature.

Legislative Office of Information Services The office provides information technology support to Legislators and Legislative support staff.

Office of the Revisor of Statutes The office provides legislative legal expertise to the Kansas Legislature. Attorneys in the office are responsible for drafting bills and other legislation, staffing legislative committees, publishing the Kansas Statutes Annotated, and offering legal consultation to members of the Kansas Legislature
