= Rich Township, Kansas =

Rich Township
- Township
- Location in Anderson County
- Coordinates: 38°04′30″N 095°07′56″W
- Country: United States
- State: Kansas
- County: Anderson

Area
  - Total: 30.2 sq mi (78.1 km^{2})
  - Land: 30.0 sq mi (77.7 km^{2})
  - Water: 0.15 sq mi (0.4 km^{2}) 0.49%
- Elevation: 1,024 ft (312 m)

Population (2010)
  - Total: 288
  - Density: 9.6/sq mi (3.7/km^{2})
- GNIS feature ID: 0478139

Rich Township is a township in Anderson County, Kansas, United States. As of the 2010 census, its population was 288.

== Geography ==
Rich Township covers an area of 30.2 square miles (78.1 km^{2}) and contains one incorporated settlement, Kincaid. According to the USGS, it contains two cemeteries: Kincaid and Mount Zion.
