= Crest High School (Kansas) =

Location
- 603 East Broad Street; Colony, Kansas 66015; United States; 38.071833°N 95.361581°W

Information
- School type: Public, High School
- School district: Crest USD 479
- CEEB code: 170640
- Staff: 5.25 (FTE)
- Grades: 9-12
- Enrollment: 77 (2023–2024)
- Student to teacher ratio: 14.67
- Campus: Rural
- Colors: Red and Blue
- Mascot: Lancer
- Rival: Marmaton Valley High School
- Newspaper: The Lancer
- Website: School Website

Crest High School is a fully accredited public high school located in Colony, Kansas, United States, serving students in grades 9-12, and operated by the Crest USD 479 school district. The school colors are red and blue and the school mascot is the Lancer. Crest High serves approximately 100 students per year. The athletic teams at Crest High compete in the 1A division according to the Kansas State High School Activities Association.

== Extracurricular activities ==
=== Athletics ===
The extracurricular activities offered at Crest High School are small and limited due to the school's small size. The athletic teams offered are referred to as the Lancers and they compete in the 1A division according to the Kansas State High School Activities Association.

Crest High School offers the following sports:

=== Fall ===
- Football
- Volleyball
- Cheerleading
- Cross Country

=== Winter ===
- Boys Basketball
- Girls Basketball
- Winter Cheerleading

=== Spring ===
- Boys Track and Field
- Girls Track and Field
- Baseball
- Softball

== See also ==
- List of high schools in Kansas
- List of unified school districts in Kansas
