= Andrew Horatio Reeder =

American politician

Andrew H. Reeder
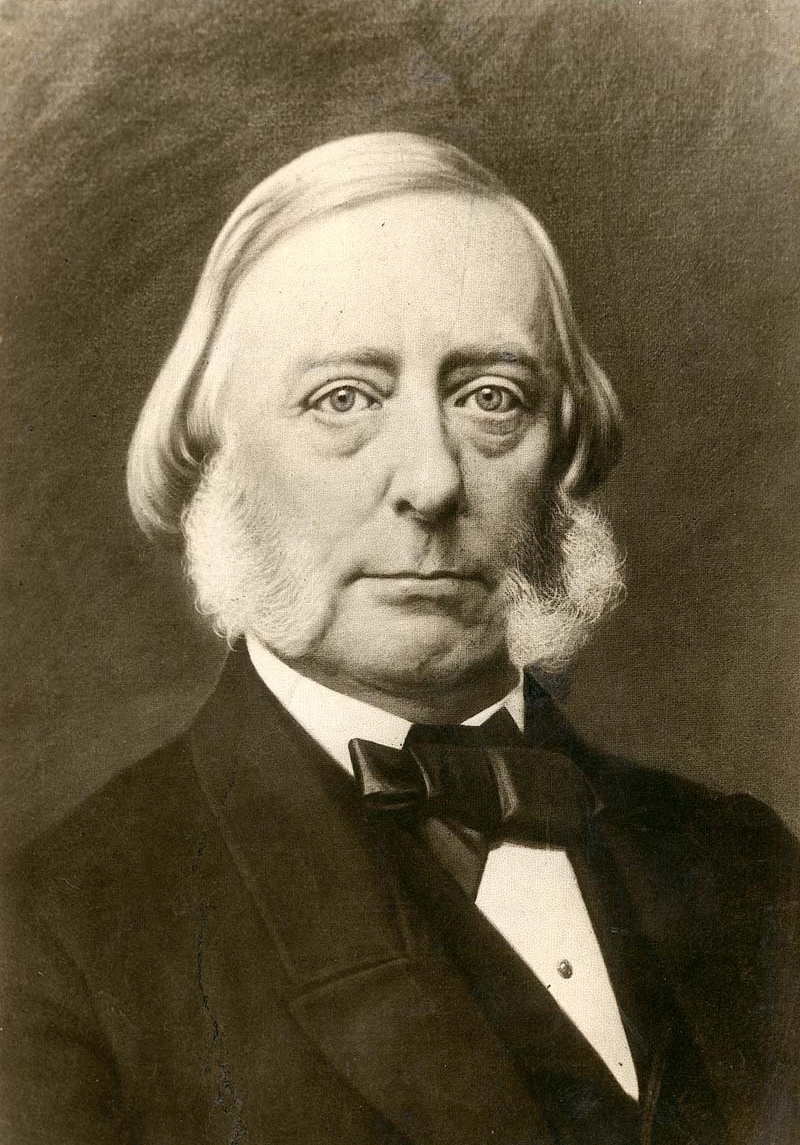
- Reeder in the 1850s

1st Territorial Governor of Kansas
- In office July 7, 1854 – August 16, 1855
- Preceded by: Office established
- Succeeded by: Wilson Shannon

Personal details
- Born: July 12, 1807 Easton, Pennsylvania, U.S.
- Died: July 5, 1864 (aged 56) Easton, Pennsylvania, U.S.
- Party: Democrat (until 1860); Republican (from 1860)
- Spouse: Amalia Hutter
- Children: 10, including Frank Reeder
- Profession: attorney, soldier

Andrew Horatio Reeder (July 12, 1807 – July 5, 1864) was the first governor of the Territory of Kansas.

== Biography ==
Reeder was born in Easton, Pennsylvania to Absolom Reeder and Christina (Smith) Reeder. He was educated at an academy in Lawrenceville, New Jersey. He read law in a Pennsylvania law office and was admitted to the bar there in 1828. In 1831, he married Frederika Amalia Hutter. Together they had three sons and seven daughters.

== Career ==
Reeder was a very loyal member of the Democratic Party and supported the idea of popular sovereignty which dealt with territories' decisions on the issue of slavery. On June 29, 1854, President Franklin Pierce appointed Reeder to the office of the governor of the territory of Kansas and remained in office until August 16, 1855, when he was fired.

Reeder took the oath of office on July 7 and arrived in Kansas on October 7. He served until April 17, 1855, when he left the territory, making Daniel Woodson acting territorial governor. Reeder returned to the Kansas Territory on June 23. As governor of the Territory of Kansas, Reeder was a proponent of the controversial Kansas-Nebraska Act, which let each territory's residents decide whether to allow or prohibit slavery. On March 30, 1855, one of the biggest voting frauds took place, when neighboring Missourians came into the Kansas Territory to vote illegally on the issue of Kansas being admitted into the US as a free state or a slave state. The incident caused border violence between Kansas and Missouri, part of the Bleeding Kansas period. Reeder refused to ratify the results, called for a new election to fill the vacancies, and designated the townsite of Pawnee as the meeting place for the first territorial legislature.

Reeder grew frustrated by the antics of the pro-slavery faction in Kansas, and on August 15, 1855, he was formally dismissed from office by Pierce for his refusal to use his position to aid in making Kansas a slave state. Thereafter, Reeder began taking an active role in the Free-State movement (hence why he has been described a "Free-State Democrat"). He attended the Big Springs Convention on September 5, 1855, the Topeka Constitutional Convention, held from October 23 to November 11, 1855; at the latter event, he and James Lane were selected to become Kansas' senators if the territory became a state under the Topeka Constitution. In October 1855, Reeder also ran as the Free-State candidate for congressional delegate. In May 1856, Reeder learned that he was likely to be indicted for high treason by the Lecompton government, and so he left the territory, disguised as a wood-chopper.

Reeder returned to Pennsylvania and remained in politics, arguing in favor of the Free-State cause. During the 1856 presidential election, he made speeches on behalf of John C. Frémont, the Republican Party's candidate. In 1860, he formally joined the Republican Party and attended the 1860 Republican National Convention, where he received fifty-one votes for Vice President, putting him in fourth place. When the Civil War broke out, Abraham Lincoln offered him a commission as a brigadier general, but Reeder turned down the offer for fear that he lacked military experience.

== Death ==
Andrew Horatio Reeder died in Easton, Pennsylvania, on July 5, 1864, and is buried in Easton Cemetery. Reeder Street on College Hill is named for him.
