= List of inselbergs =

An inselberg (or monadnock) is an isolated hill, knob, ridge, outcrop, or small mountain that rises abruptly from a gently sloping or virtually level surrounding plain. The following is a list of notable inselbergs worldwide.

== Africa ==
Cameroon

- Ngog Lituba in the Sanaga-Maritime Department

Côte d'Ivoire (Ivory Coast)

- Mont Niénokoué in Taï National Park

Kenya

- Sergoit Hill

Madagascar

- Mont Angavokely
- Pic Boby, part of the Andringitra Massif

Malawi

- Mulanje Massif

Mali

- Hand of Fatima

Mozambique

- Mount Chiperone
- Mount Inago
- Mount Mabu
- Mount Namuli
- Serra Jeci
- Serra Mecula
- Mount Lico

Nigeria

- Wase Rock
- Zuma Rock

Tunisia

- Jugurtha Tableland

Zimbabwe

- Castle Beacon in the Bvumba Mountain

== Americas ==
Argentina

- Various ignimbrite inselbergs in Sierra de Lihuel Calel, La Pampa Province

Brazil

- Pedra Agulha in Pancas, Espírito Santo

Canada

- Gaff Topsails in Newfoundland
- Mount Sylvester in Newfoundland
- Mount Carleton in New Brunswick
- Mount Cheminis/Mont Chaudron in Ontario/Quebec.
- Mont Mégantic in Quebec near Scotstown

Colombia

- Peñol de Entrerríos, Antioquia
- Peñol de Guatapé (La Piedra de Peñol), Antioquia
- Cerros de Mavecure, Guainía
- Tabor Mount, Antioquia

Guyana

- Makatau Mountain

Mexico

- Cerro el Almacén, Bahía de los Ángeles, Baja California Norte

United States

- Mount Monadnock in New Hampshire; the mountain where the term originated
- Alcovy Mountain in Georgia
- Arabia Mountain in Georgia
- Baraboo Range in Wisconsin
- Boar's Tusk in Wyoming
- Chief Mountain in Montana
- Crowders Mountain near Kings Mountain, North Carolina
- Devils Tower in Wyoming
- Double Mountain in Texas
- Enchanted Rock in Texas
- Glassy Mountain near Pickens, South Carolina
- Joshua Tree National Park in southern California
- Little Mountain in Newberry County, South Carolina
- Looking Glass Rock in North Carolina
- McCaslin Mountain in northeast Wisconsin
- Monadnock Mountain in northern Vermont
- Mount Agamenticus in Maine
- Mount Angel in Oregon
- Mount Ascutney in southern Vermont
- Mount Wachusett in Massachusetts
- Panola Mountain in Georgia
- Paris Mountain near Greenville, South Carolina
- Peine Mound in Anderson County, Kansas
- Pilot Mountain in North Carolina
- Rib Mountain in Wisconsin
- Shiprock in New Mexico
- Stone Mountain in Georgia
- Stone Mountain in North Carolina
- Sugarloaf Mountain in Maryland
- Thicketty Mountain in Cherokee County, South Carolina
- Willis Mountain in Virginia

Venezuela

- Piedra del Cocuy

== Asia ==
India

- Meruda Takkar
- Savandurga

Israel

- Mount Tabor

Sri Lanka

- Pidurangala Rock
- Ritigala
- Sigiriya

Thailand

- Khao Ok Thalu
- Phu Thok

Malaysia

- Mount Jerai
- Mount Lambak
- Mount Ledang
- Mount Madai
- Mount Santubong

== Australia ==
- Boyagin Rock
- Gill Pinnacle
- Hyden Rock of which Wave Rock is part
- Kokerbin Rock
- Mount Augustus, Western Australia
- Mount Conner (Attila)
- Mount Cooran
- Mount Cooroora
- Mount Cooroy
- Mount Oxley (New South Wales)
- Murphy's Hay Stack
- Pildappa Rock
- Uluru (Ayers Rock, 863 m) and Kata Tjuta (The Olgas), both within Uluru-Kata Tjuta National Park
- The You Yangs, Victoria

== Europe ==
Finland

- Lattunavaara
- Naltiotunturi
- Pyhätunturi
- Sattasvaara
- Terävä

Italy

- Rocca di Cavour, Cavour, Piedmont
- Pietra di Bismantova, Castelnovo ne' Monti, Reggio Emilia, Emilia-Romagna

Hungary

- Somlóhegy

Norway

- Hårteigen

Portugal

- Monsanto da Beira

Serbia

- Fruška Gora

Sweden

- Blå Jungfrun
- Dundret

United Kingdom

- North Berwick Law in Scotland
- Suilven in Scotland
- The Wrekin in England
- The Malvern Hills in England
- Brent Knoll in England

== See also ==
- Bornhardt
- Butte
- Monolith
