= Peine Mound =

Inselberg in Anderson County, Kansas, U.S.

- Peine Mound as seen from Spencer's Crossing Bridge

Highest point
- Elevation: 1,009 ft (308 m)
- Prominence: 124 ft (38 m)
- Coordinates: 38.3762°N 95.1495°W

Geography
- Location within Kansas
- Location: Anderson County, Kansas, U.S.

Peine Mound (formerly known as Wadsworth Mound or Steamboat Mound; a.k.a. John Brown's Lookout) is a 900-foot-wide, 120-foot-tall inselberg in Anderson County, Kansas, United States, near the city of Greeley.

== History ==
Inselbergs such as Peine Mound are formed when rocks resistant to erosion are surrounded by and sit on top of weaker rocks. This results in the surrounding landscape lowering, while the resistant rock remains, shielding the softer rock beneath it.

Due to its unique geography, the mound has been used by humans for centuries. Native American arrowheads and graves have been found on the mound's summit.

During the Bleeding Kansas period of the 1850s, abolitionist leader John Brown used Peine Mound as a vantage point and as a hideout, as it was covered in tall prairie grass at the time. In 1856, the Pottawatomie massacre occurred five miles away at Pottawatomie Creek, and the nearby town of Greeley was formed by Free-Staters. The following September, residents of Greeley relocated to a town near the mound, which was first called "Pottawatomie" and then "Mt. Gilead". Within two to three years, Mt. Gilead's post office was closed and the town was abandoned, with its residents moving back to Greeley.

Peine Mound was originally named "Wadsworth Mound" after an early settler of the location. In 1886, the land came under ownership of the Peine family. By the early 20th century, it was surrounded by a hedge and was being used by the Peines as a pasture for Indian ponies. In the 1970s, hang gliders from Kansas City were using the mound.

== Gallery ==
Peine Mound in 1936 (The Kansas City Star)

Peine Mound in 1959 (The Kansas City Star)

== See also ==
- List of inselbergs
