= Spencer's Crossing Bridge =

- U.S. National Register of Historic Places
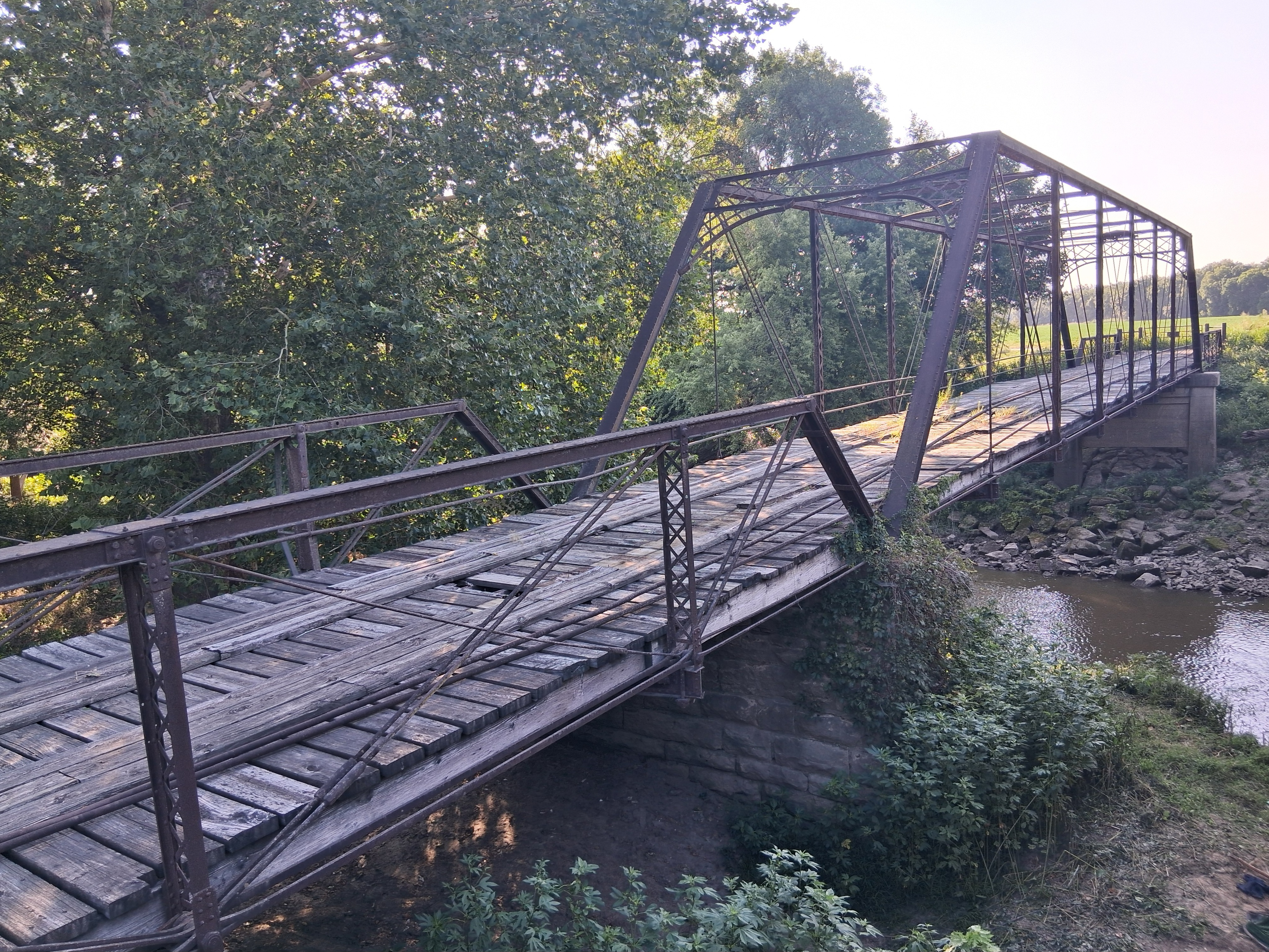
- Spencer's Crossing Bridge in 2026

- Location within Kansas Location within the United States
- Location: Over Pottawatomie Creek, northwest of Greeley, Kansas
- Coordinates: 38°22′39″N 95°08′51″W
- Area: Less than one acre
- Built: 1885
- Built by: Wrought Iron Bridge Builders
- Architectural style: Pratt through truss
- MPS: Metal Truss Bridges in Kansas 1861--1939 MPS
- NRHP reference No.: 89002177
- Added to NRHP: January 4, 1990

Spencer's Crossing Bridge, near Greeley, Kansas, was built in 1885. It was listed on the National Register of Historic Places in 1990. It has also been known as Greeley Bridge.

Its center span is a 129 feet (39 m) Pratt through truss. The west and east spans are 60 feet (18 m) and 40 feet (12 m) Pratt pony trusses. All are 16 feet (4.9 m) wide. The bridge was built by Wrought Iron Bridge Builders.

It is located about .1 mile north, and .6 miles west of Greeley.

== See also ==
- Peine Mound, located within view of the bridge
