= Walker Township, Kansas =

Walker Township
- Township
- Location in Anderson County
- Coordinates: 38°22′10″N 095°06′41″W
- Country: United States
- State: Kansas
- County: Anderson

Area
  - Total: 45.3 sq mi (117.3 km^{2})
  - Land: 44.9 sq mi (116.4 km^{2})
  - Water: 0.35 sq mi (0.9 km^{2}) 0.79%
- Elevation: 909 ft (277 m)

Population (2010)
  - Total: 668
  - Density: 15/sq mi (5.7/km^{2})
- GNIS feature ID: 0477612

Walker Township is a township in Anderson County, Kansas, United States. As of the 2010 census, its population was 668.

== History ==
Walker Township was established in 1857. It was named for Robert J. Walker, fourth Territorial Governor of Kansas.

== Geography ==
Walker Township covers an area of 45.3 square miles (117.3 km^{2}) and contains one incorporated settlement, Greeley. According to the USGS, it contains two cemeteries: Saint John and Sutton Valley.

The stream of South Fork Pottawatomie Creek runs through this township.
