= Na Sabaeng =

Na Sabaeng นาสะแบง
- Subdistrict
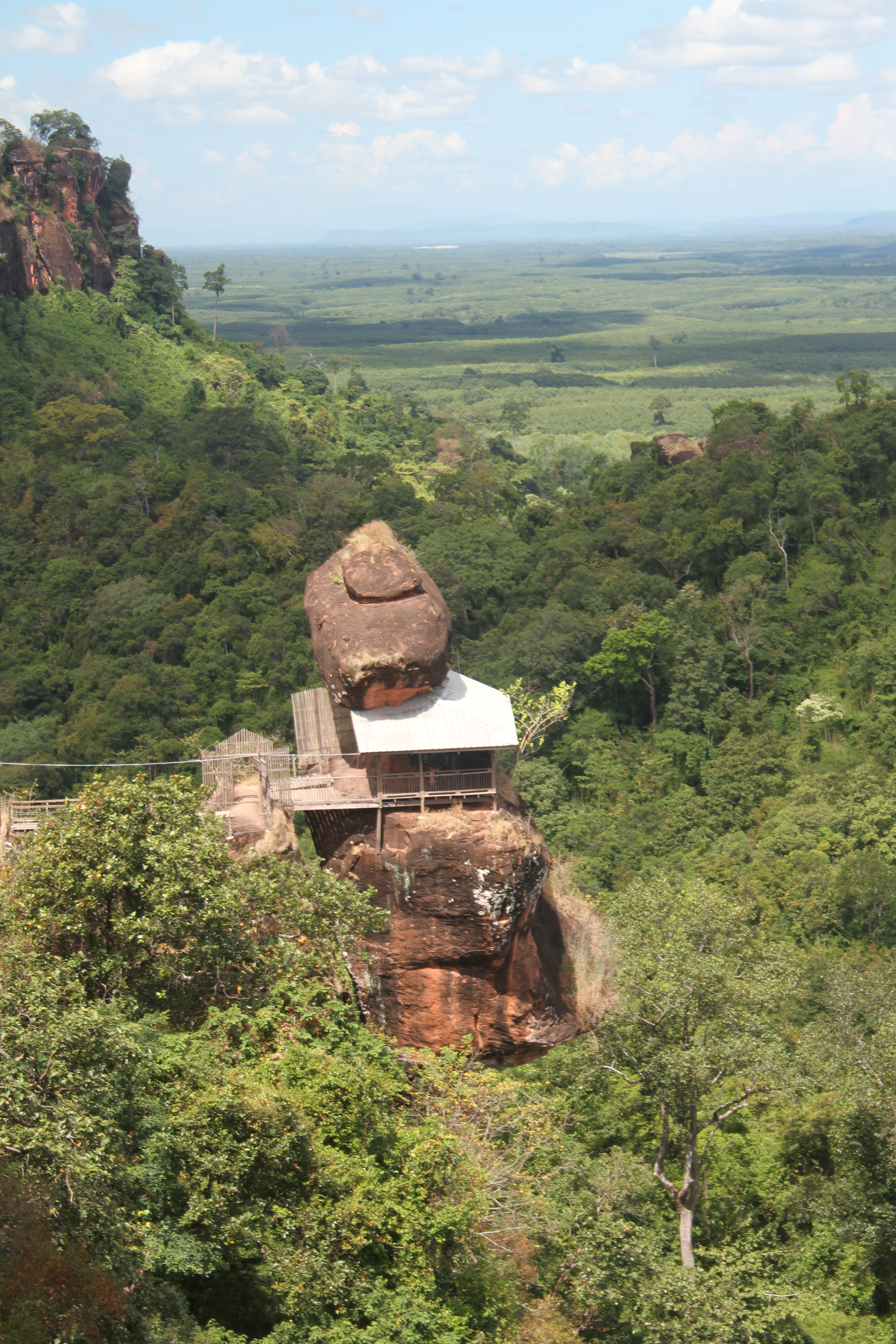
- View from Phu Thok summit
- Interactive map of Na Sabaeng
- Country: Thailand
- Province: Bueng Kan
- District: Si Wilai District

Population (2010)
  - Total: 6,188
- Time zone: UTC+7 (ICT)
- Postal code: 38210
- TIS 1099: 380704

Na Sabaeng is a sub-district (tambon) in Si Wilai District, in the heart of Bueng Kan Province, northeastern Thailand. As of 2010, it had a population of 6188 people, with jurisdiction over nine villages.

Phu Thok, the emblematic mountain of the province, is in this sub-district.
