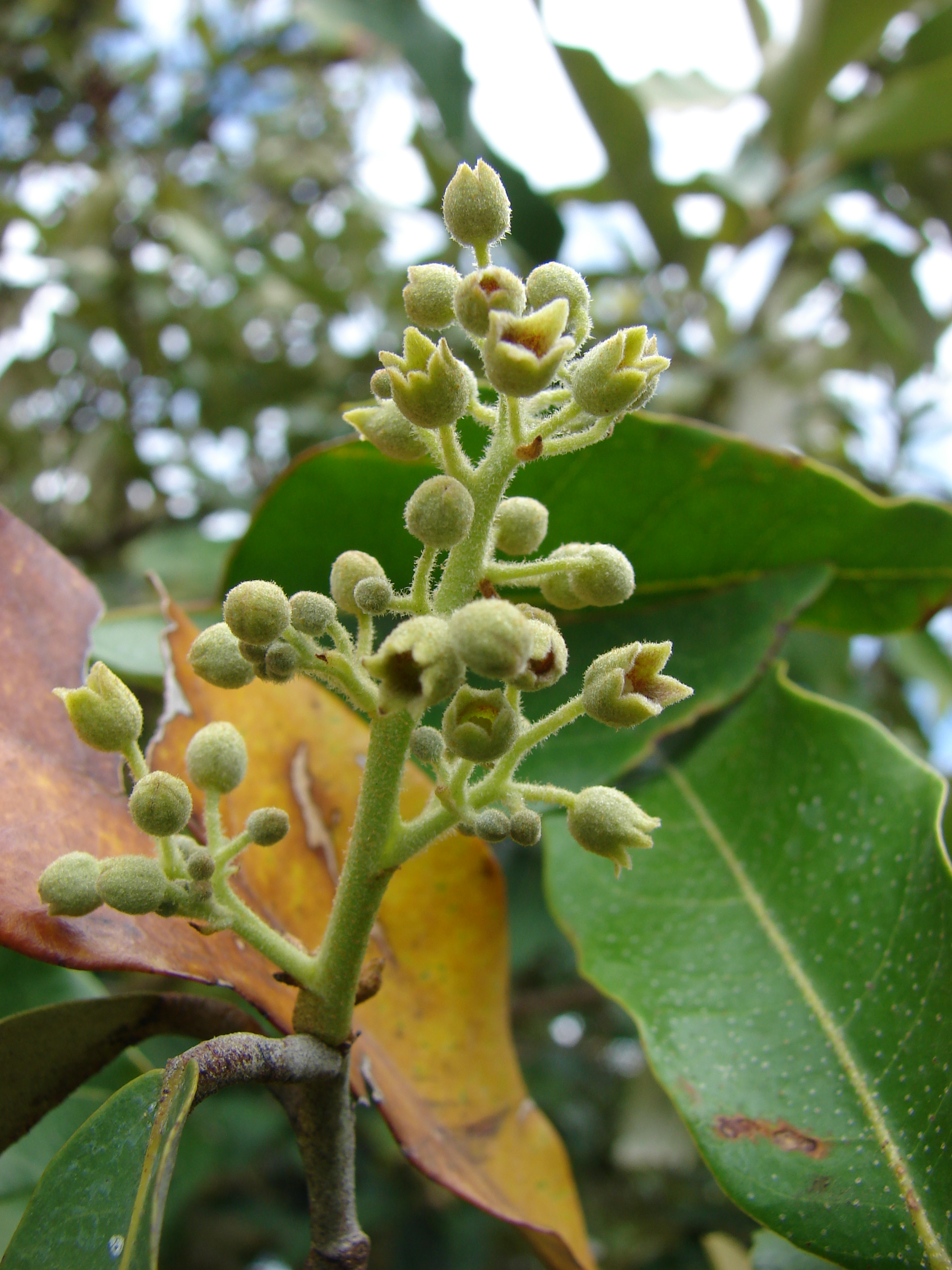
- Heritiera littoralis

Scientific classification
- Kingdom: Plantae
- Clade: Tracheophytes
- Clade: Angiosperms
- Clade: Eudicots
- Clade: Rosids
- Order: Malvales
- Family: Malvaceae
- Subfamily: Sterculioideae
- Genus: Heritiera; Aiton

Species
- see text

Synonyms
- Amygdalus Burm. ex Kuntze; Balanopteris Gaertn.; Fometica Raf.; Sutherlandia J.F.Gmel.; Systemon Regel; Tarrietia Blume

= Heritiera =

Genus of flowering plants

Heritiera is a genus of flowering plants in the family Malvaceae, subfamily Sterculioideae. They are most dominant tropical forest trees in several areas in eastern Africa and India to the Pacific. Some are mangroves. Several are valuable for their timber and are over-exploited.

== Species ==
35 species are accepted.

- Heritiera albiflora (Ridl.) Kosterm.
- Heritiera angustata Pierre
- Heritiera arafurensis Kosterm.
- Heritiera aurea Kosterm.
- Heritiera borneensis (Merr.) Kosterm.
- Heritiera burmensis Kosterm.
- Heritiera catappa Kosterm.
- Heritiera cordata Kosterm.
- Heritiera densiflora (Pellegr.) Kosterm.
- Heritiera dubia Wall. ex Kurz
- Heritiera elata Ridl.
- Heritiera fomes Banks
- Heritiera gigantea Kosterm.
- Heritiera globosa Kosterm.
- Heritiera impressinervia Kosterm.
- Heritiera javanica (Blume) Kosterm.
- Heritiera kanikensis Majumdar & L.K.Banerjee
- Heritiera kuenstleri (King) Kosterm.
- Heritiera littoralis Aiton
- Heritiera longipetiolata Kaneh.
- Heritiera macroptera Kosterm.
- Heritiera magnifica Kosterm.
- Heritiera montana Kosterm.
- Heritiera novoguineensis Kosterm.
- Heritiera ornithocephala Kosterm.
- Heritiera papilio Bedd.
- Heritiera parvifolia Merr.
- Heritiera percoriacea Kosterm.
- Heritiera pterospermoides Kosterm.
- Heritiera rumphii Kosterm.
- Heritiera simplicifolia (Mast.) Kosterm.
- Heritiera solomonensis Kosterm.
- Heritiera sumatrana (Miq.) Kosterm.
- Heritiera sylvatica S.Vidal
- Heritiera utilis (Sprague) Sprague

=== Formerly placed here ===
- Argyrodendron actinophyllum (F.Muell.) Edlin (as H. actinophylla (F.M.Bailey) Kosterm.)
- Argyrodendron peralatum (F.M.Bailey) Edlin ex I.H.Boas (as H. peralata (F.M.Bailey) Kosterm.)
- Argyrodendron trifoliolatum F.Muell. (as H. trifoliolata (F.Muell.) Kosterm.)

== Gallery ==
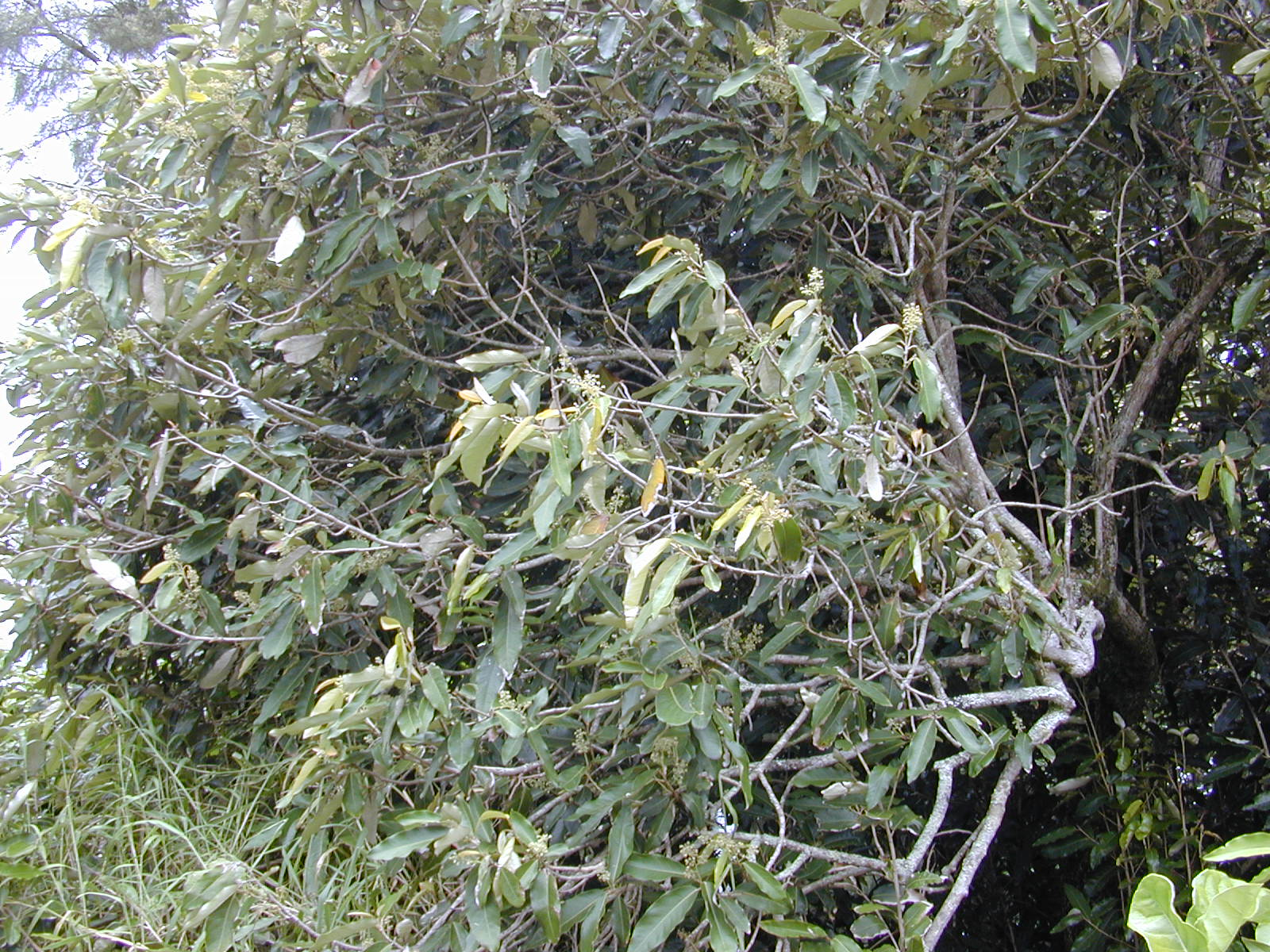

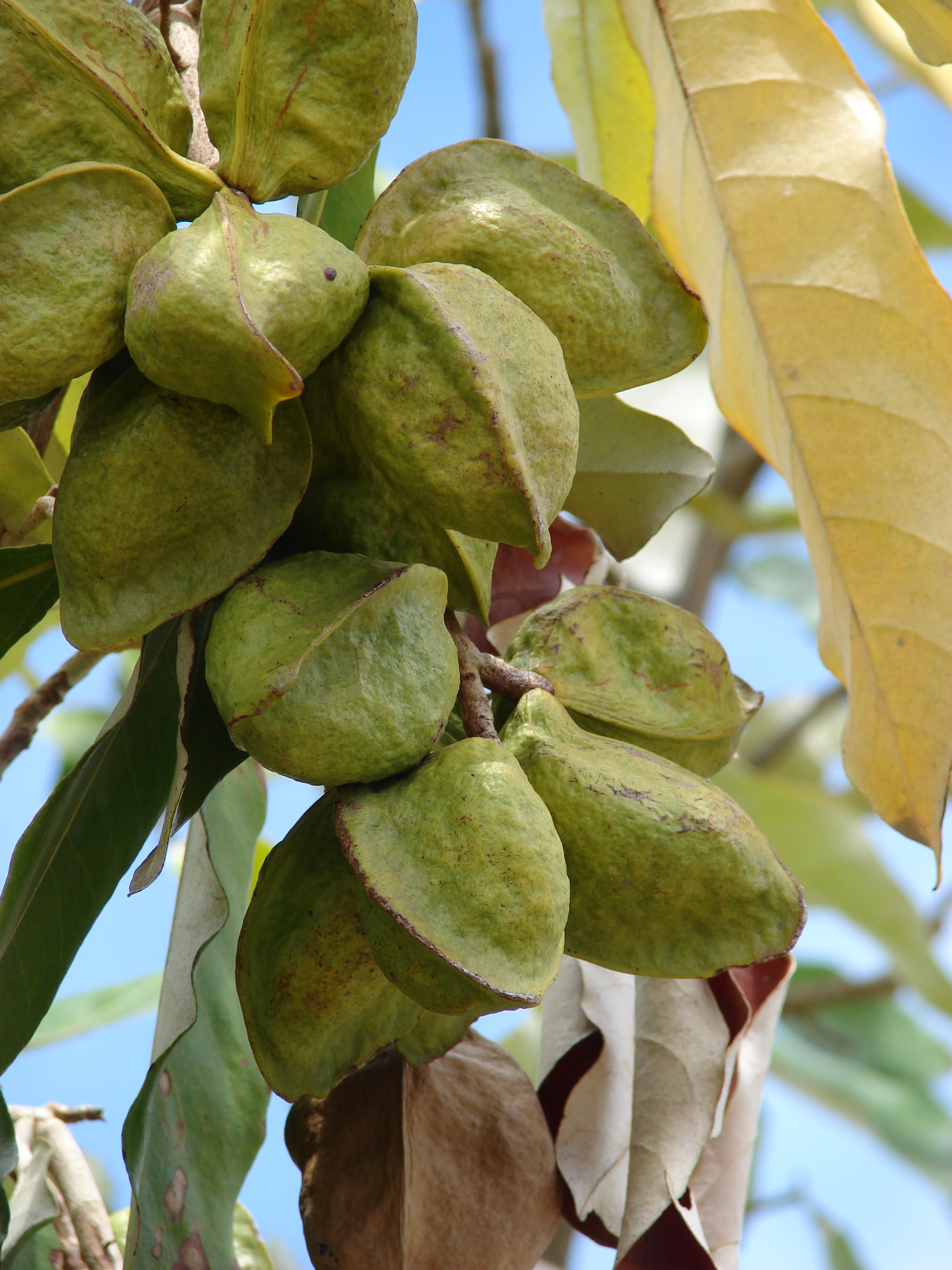
