= N'zo Partial Faunal Reserve =

Protected area in Ivory Coast

N'Zo Partial Faunal Reserve
- IUCN category IV (habitat/species management area)
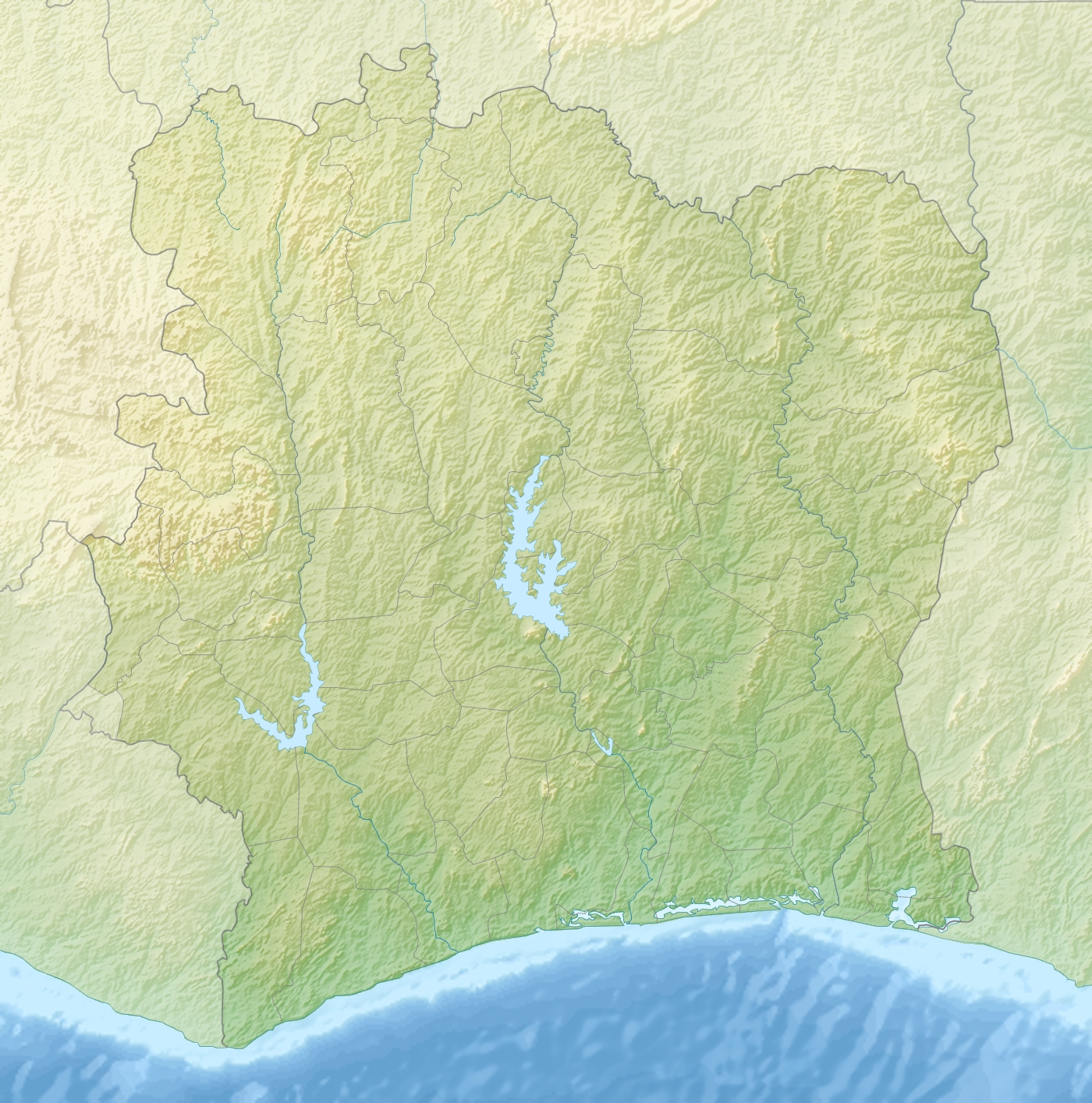
- Location within Ivory Coast
- Location: Moyen-Cavally, Ivory Coast
- Nearest city: Zakué
- Coordinates: 6°12′32″N 7°16′23″W
- Area: 950 km^{2} (370 mi^{2})
- Established: 1971

The N'Zo Partial Faunal Reserve is a designated site in Ivory Coast, given status in 1971. It covers 950 km^{2} (370 mi^{2}). Together with Tai National Park this reserve holds nearly half the total population of chimpanzees in Ivory Coast (Kormos et al.2003).
