= Heritiera parvifolia =

Conservation status
- Vulnerable (IUCN 2.3)

Scientific classification
- Kingdom: Plantae
- Clade: Tracheophytes
- Clade: Angiosperms
- Clade: Eudicots
- Clade: Rosids
- Order: Malvales
- Family: Malvaceae
- Genus: Heritiera
- Species: H. parvifolia

Binomial name
- Heritiera parvifolia Merr.

Species of flowering plant

Heritiera parvifolia is a species of flowering plant in the family Malvaceae (or Sterculiaceae). It is found only in China. It is threatened by habitat loss.
