= Heritiera percoriacea =

Conservation status
- Endangered (IUCN 3.1)

Scientific classification
- Kingdom: Plantae
- Clade: Tracheophytes
- Clade: Angiosperms
- Clade: Eudicots
- Clade: Rosids
- Order: Malvales
- Family: Malvaceae
- Genus: Heritiera
- Species: H. percoriacea

Binomial name
- Heritiera percoriacea Kosterm.

Species of flowering plant

Heritiera percoriacea is a species of flowering plant in the family Malvaceae (or Sterculiaceae). It is found only in Java, Indonesia. It is threatened by habitat loss.
