= Khadir Bet =

Island in Gujarat, India

- Satellite image showing the Thar Salt Desert (center), Gujarat Solar Park (center-bottom), and Khadir Bet (bottom-left)

- Location in Gujarat, India

Geography
- Location: Great Rann of Kutch, Gujarat, India
- Coordinates: 23°51′41″N 70°19′45″E
- Area: 200 km^{2} (77 sq mi)
- Highest elevation: 125 m (410 ft)

Administration
- India
- State: Gujarat
- District: Kutch

Khadir Bet is an island located in the Great Rann of Kutch in Gujarat, India. It spans around 200 square kilometers. It is known for its archaeological significance, particularly as the site of the ancient Indus Valley Civilization city of Dholavira, also a UNESCO world heritage site.

The term "Khadir" is derived from the Kutchi word "Khad", which translates to "grass". NH927C (called Road to Heaven) connects it to Lodran in the east, and the NH754K to Khavda in the west. Road to Infinity, a newer north-to-south 24.5 km road connecting Bambhanka on Khadir Bet to Ekal in Bhachau Taluka via salt desert and tortoise-shaped tiny Hanuman Bet island which was approved in 2022 and completed in 2026, reduced Khadir Bet to Bhachau distance from earlier 150 km to now just 75 km, thus also improved accessibility to the Dholavira World Heritage Site.

== Geography ==
It lies in the Great Rann of Kutch, approximately 5 kilometers from the mainland. Khadir Bet is triangular, with sharp cliffs on its northern edge rising up to 125 meters, while the southern part slopes gently into the surrounding salt flats. The southern part slopes gently into the surrounding salt flats. The geology of Khadir Island consists mainly of sandstones, claystone, and fossiliferous limestone, with cultivable soil in some areas.

In July 2023, researchers from the Gujarat Ecological Education and Research Foundation (GEERF) documented the presence of Salsola oppositifolia, a halophytic (salt-tolerant) shrub typically found around the Mediterranean Sea, including regions of Italy and Northern Africa, for the first time in India at Khadir Bet.

== Archaeology ==
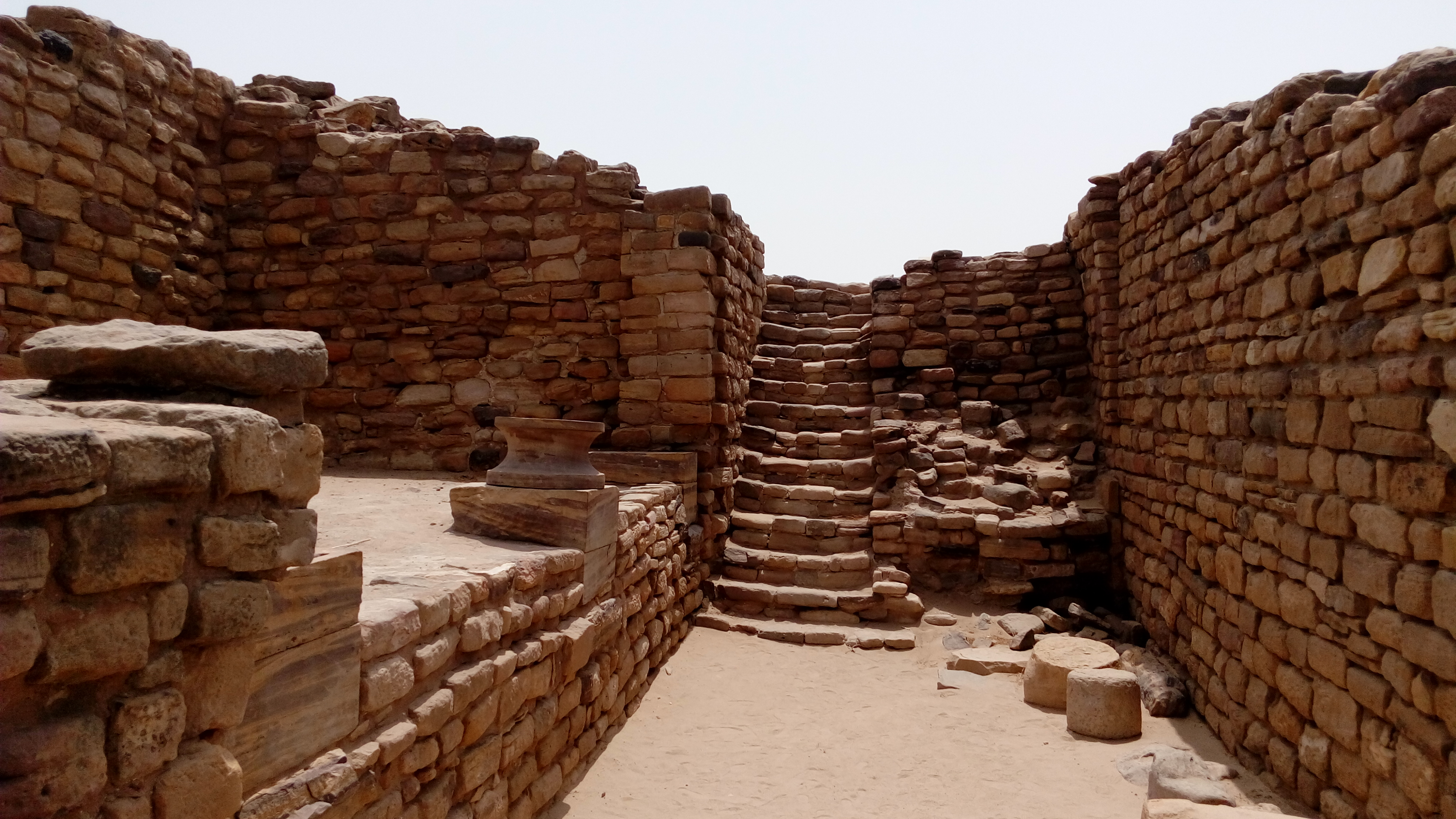
Dholavira, located on Khadir Island, is one of the largest Harappan sites in India, dating from around 2650 to 1450 BCE.

Khadir Bet is best known for its connection to Dholavira, an ancient city of the Indus Valley Civilization. The Harappans extracted over three million cubic meters of earth and rock from the island, which were used in construction, pottery, and artifact production for both local use and export.

Apart from Dholavira, several other archaeological sites have been identified on Khadir Bet. One notable site is Jhandiasar, located about 2 kilometers north of Dholavira, near a seasonal rivulet. This site reveals remnants of stone structures, such as walls and square formations, indicating it might have functioned as a harbor or logistical base for transporting materials to Dholavira. Another site, Bambhanka, located about 15 kilometers south of Dholavira, situated on a high tableland near a seasonal stream that flows into the sea.

=== Recent prehistoric findings ===
In 2025, a collaborative archaeological study led by the Indian Institute of Technology Gandhinagar (IITGN), along with researchers from IIT Kanpur, the Inter-University Accelerator Centre (IUAC), and the Physical Research Laboratory (PRL), identified prehistoric shell-midden sites on Khadir Bet and neighboring islands in the Rann of Kutch. Radiocarbon dating using Accelerator Mass Spectrometry (AMS) placed these deposits at approximately 10,000 BCE, significantly earlier than the Harappan settlement of the region.

The sites contained large accumulations of mollusc shells (including oysters and gastropods), along with lithic (stone) tools and flaking debris from tool production, suggesting habitation by coastal foraging communities. These findings point to human presence in the Kutch region during the terminal Pleistocene to early Holocene period. The sites show signs of repeated or prolonged use over time. The research proposes that such early communities were adapted to mangrove-rich coastal ecologies, and the presence of tool-making debris indicates on-site subsistence activity.

This research adds to the archaeological record of the region by indicating human presence in Kutch several millennia before the development of Harappan urban centres such as Dholavira. Similar coastal foraging patterns have also been recorded in coastal sites of present-day Pakistan and the Arabian Peninsula.

== Gallery ==
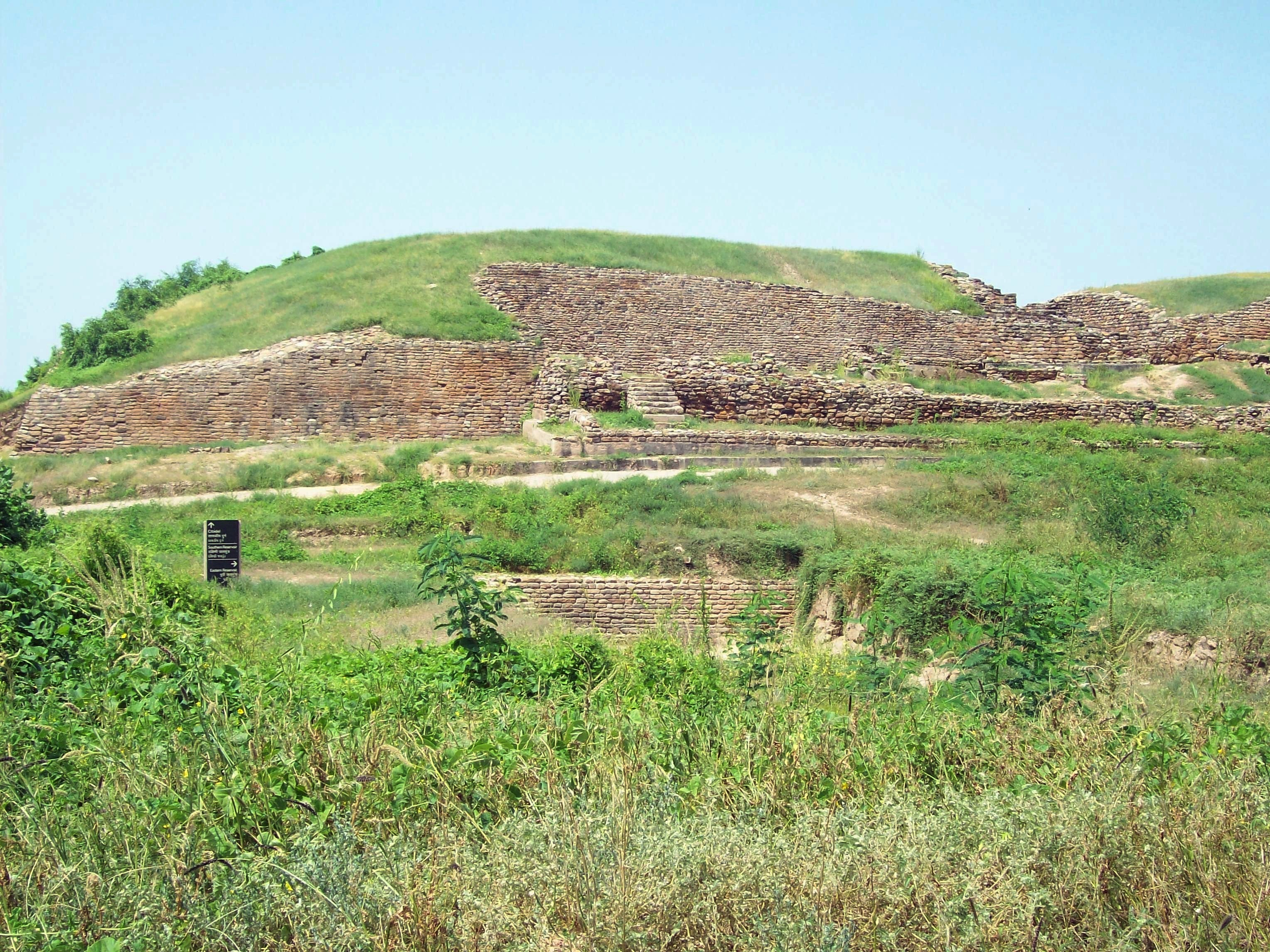
Dholavira, Khadir Bet

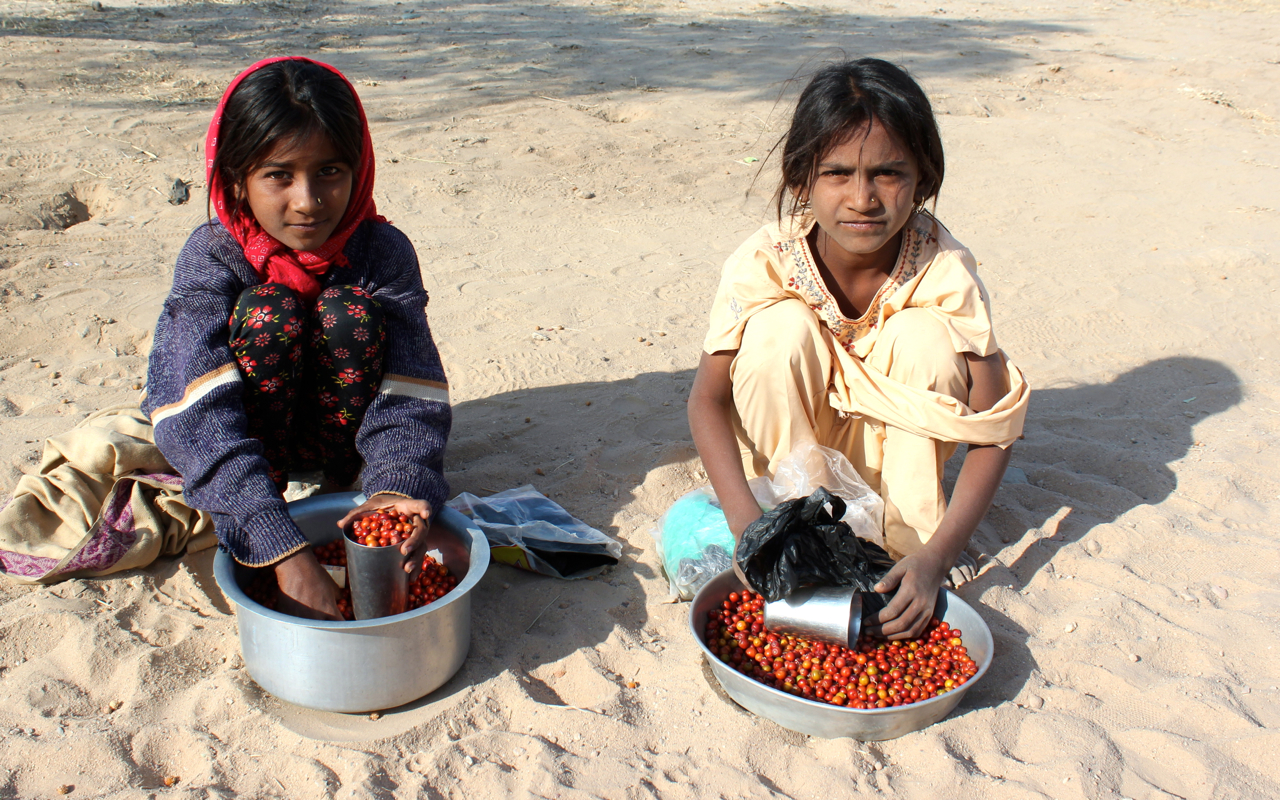
Fruit vendors

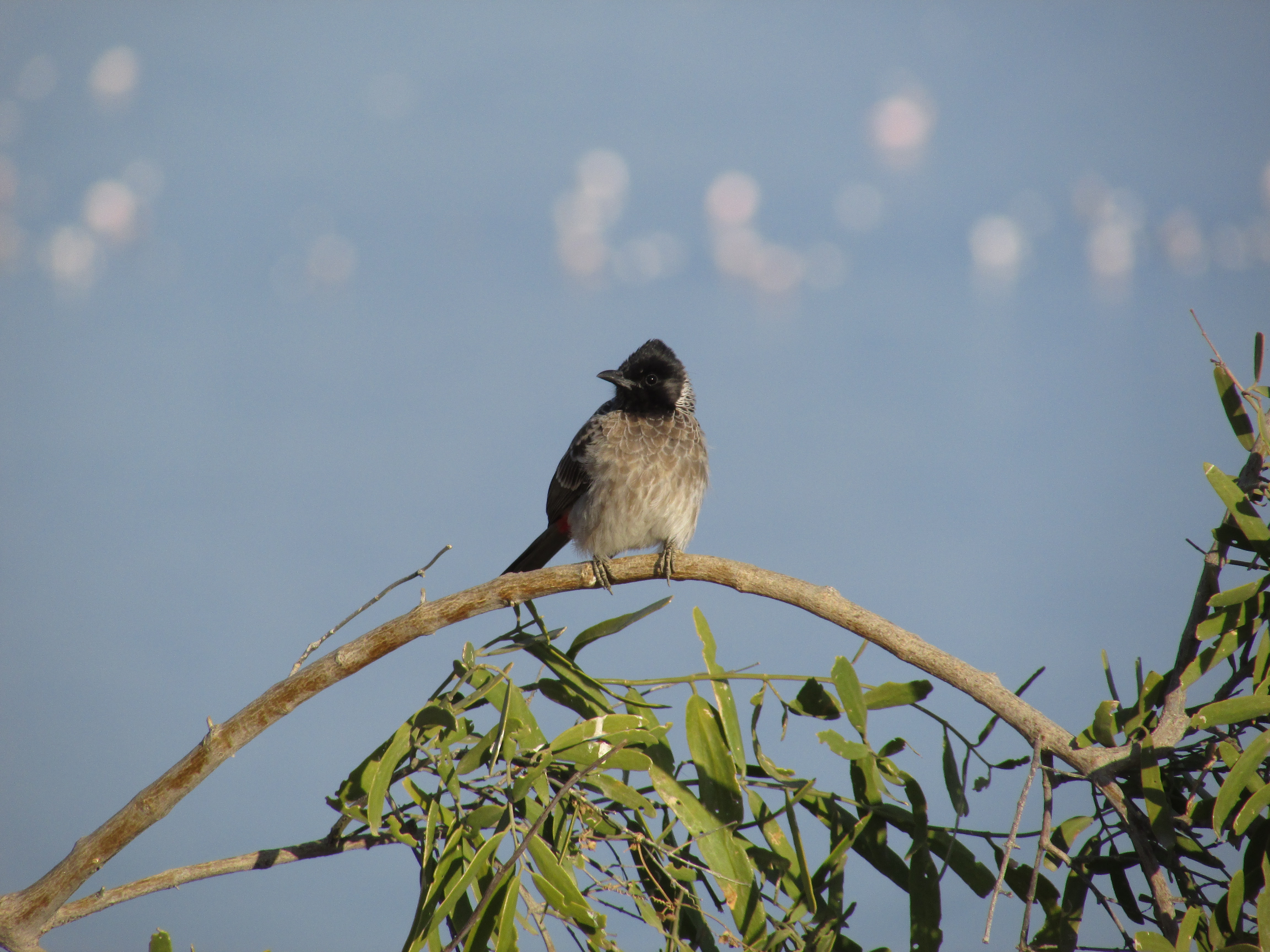
A bird

== See also ==
- Great Rann of Kutch
- Meruda Takkar
- Kutch Desert Wildlife Sanctuary
