= Hyperolius nienokouensis =

Conservation status
- Endangered (IUCN 3.1)

Scientific classification
- Kingdom: Animalia
- Phylum: Chordata
- Class: Amphibia
- Order: Anura
- Family: Hyperoliidae
- Genus: Hyperolius
- Species: H. nienokouensis

Binomial name
- Hyperolius nienokouensis Rödel, 1998

Species of amphibian

Hyperolius nienokouensis is a species of frogs in the family Hyperoliidae. It is endemic to Ivory Coast. It is only known from the Taï National Park and one locality 30 km to the north. Its natural habitats are subtropical or tropical moist lowland forests, swamps, and intermittent freshwater marshes. It is threatened by habitat loss.
