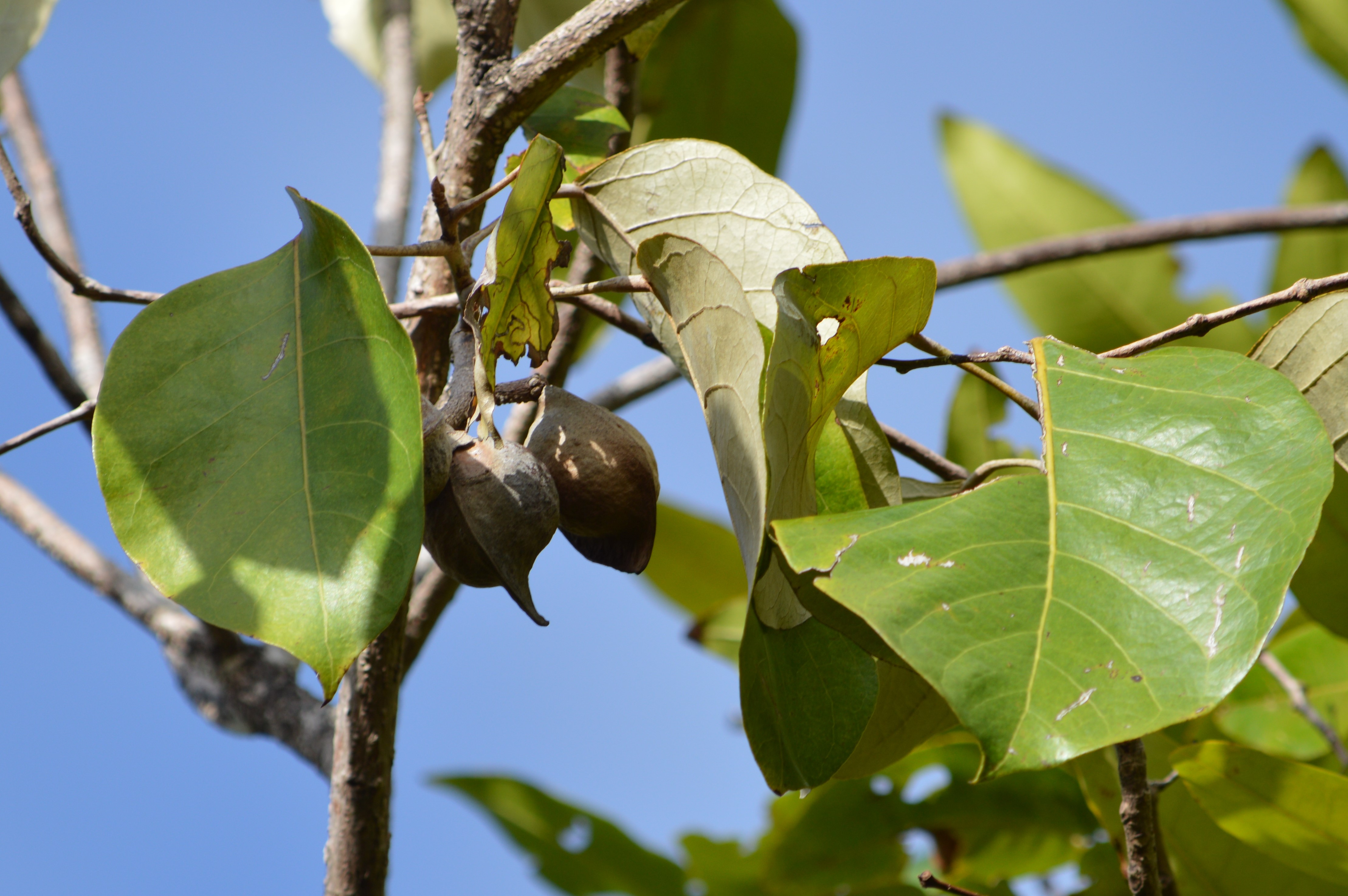
- Ufa-hålomtåno leaves and fruits, Guam

Conservation status
- Vulnerable (IUCN 2.3)

- Endangered (ESA)

Scientific classification
- Kingdom: Plantae
- Clade: Tracheophytes
- Clade: Angiosperms
- Clade: Eudicots
- Clade: Rosids
- Order: Malvales
- Family: Malvaceae
- Genus: Heritiera
- Species: H. longipetiolata

Binomial name
- Heritiera longipetiolata Kaneh.

= Heritiera longipetiolata =

Species of flowering plant

Heritiera longipetiolata (Chamorro: Ufa-hålomtåno) is a species of flowering plant in the family Malvaceae. It is found in Guam, Northern Mariana Islands, and in the Caroline Islands. It is threatened by habitat loss.

== See also ==
List of endemic plants in the Mariana Islands
