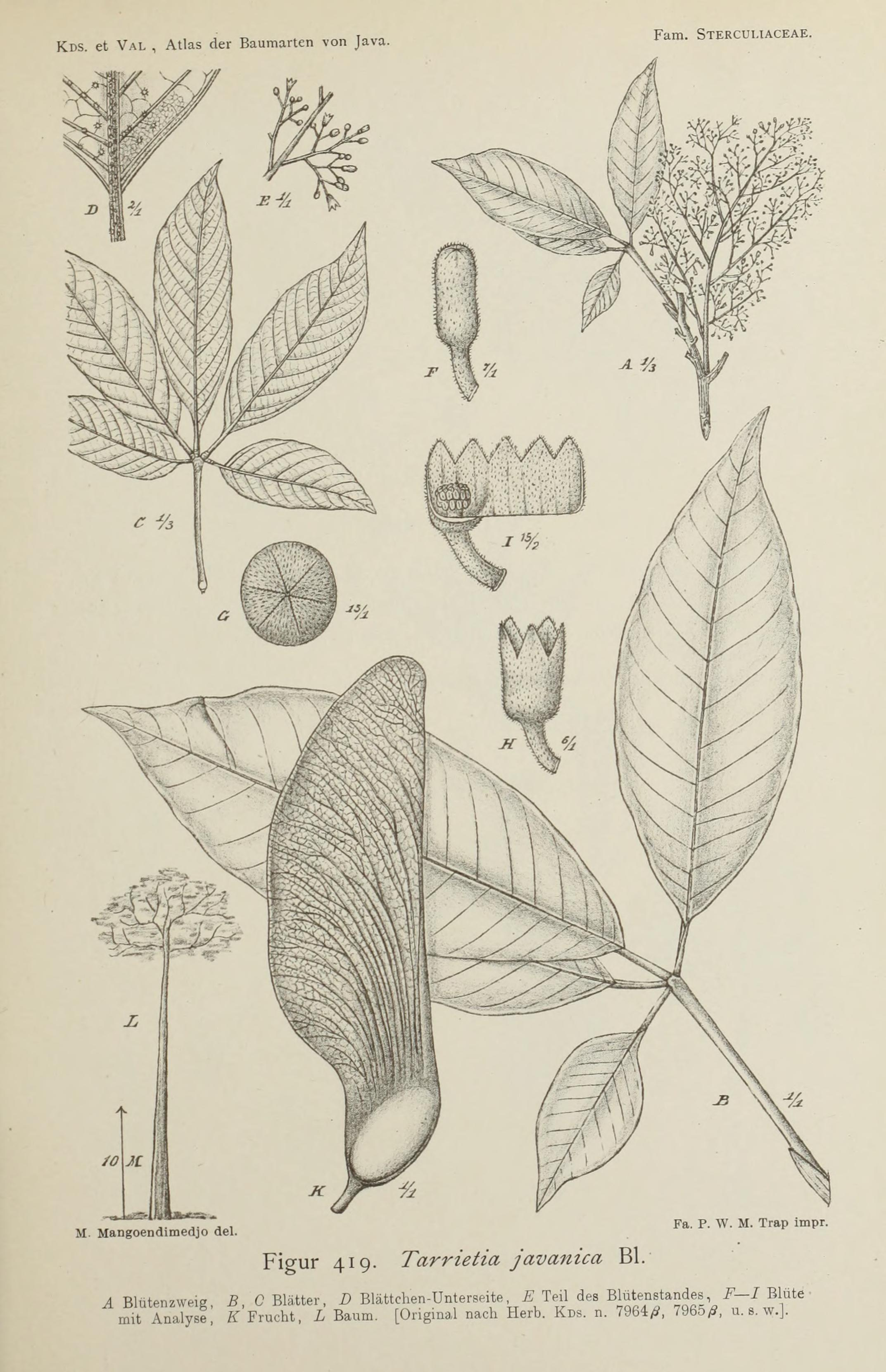

Scientific classification
- Kingdom: Plantae
- Clade: Tracheophytes
- Clade: Angiosperms
- Clade: Eudicots
- Clade: Rosids
- Order: Malvales
- Family: Malvaceae
- Genus: Heritiera
- Species: H. javanica

Binomial name
- Heritiera javanica (Bl.) Kosterm.

Synonyms
- Tarrietia javanica Bl. Tarrietia cochinchinensis Pierre. Heritiera cochinchinensis (Pierre) Kostermans

= Heritiera javanica =

Species of flowering plant

Heritiera javanica is a species of tree in the family Malvaceae, subfamily Sterculioideae.

Like other species in this subfamily, flowers are unisexual; trees may grows up to 40 m high, and their Vietnamese name (under H. cochinchinensis) is huỷnh. No subspecies are listed in the Catalogue of Life.

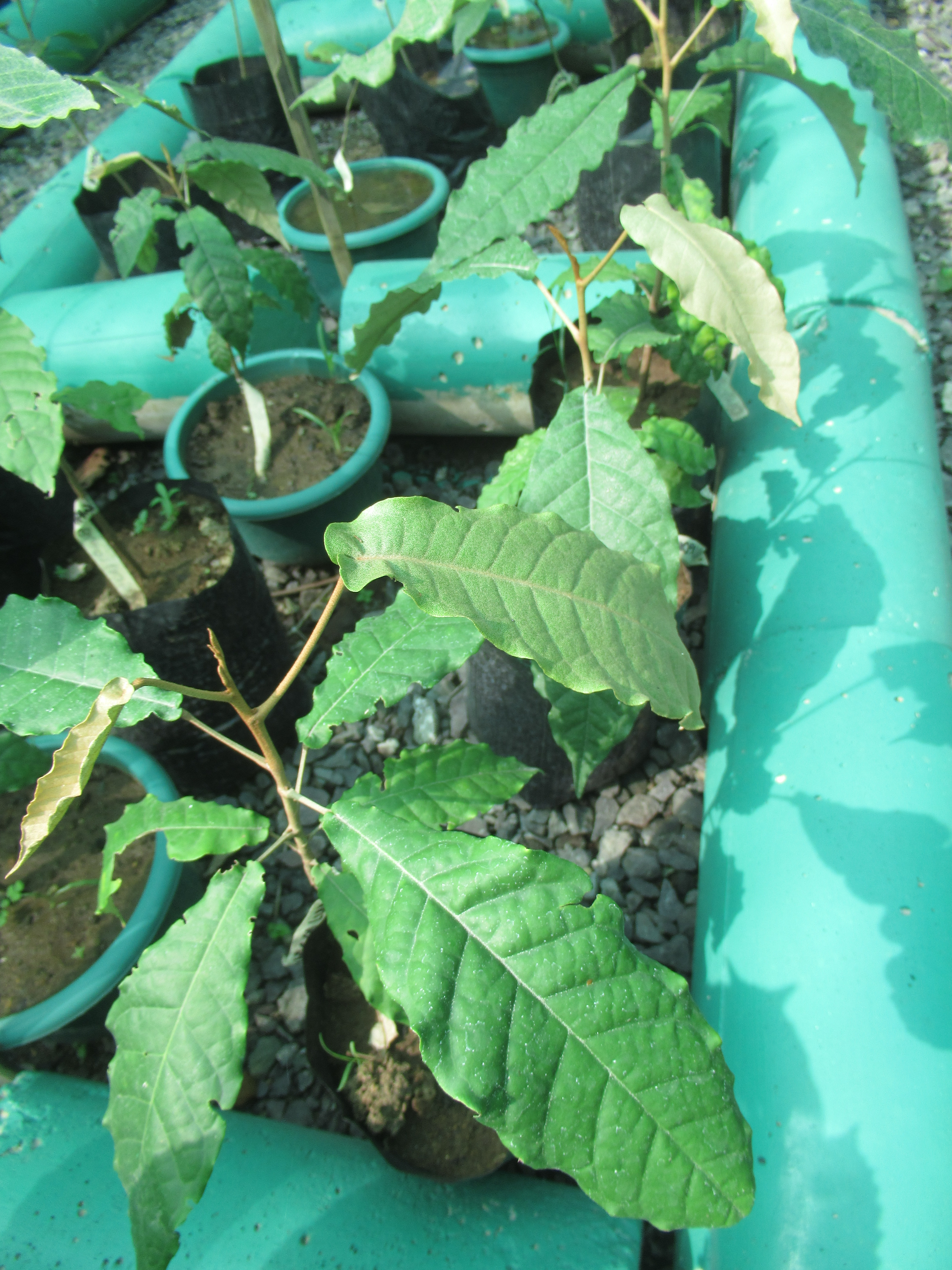
Dungeon lumbayao (Philippines)
