= Mont Niénokoué =

Mountain in Ivory Coast

Coordinates: 5°26′00″N 7°10′00″W

Mont Niénokoué is an inselberg in the Taï National Park in the Bas-Sassandra District of south-west Ivory Coast. Its summit is 396 meters (1299 ft) above sea level and 216 meters above the surrounding terrain. Its base circumference is about 40 kilometers.

The average temperature is 21 °C. The warmest month is February, at 23 °C, and the coldest August, at 17 °C. The average rainfall is 1,979 millimeters per year. The wettest month is June, with an average of 307 millimeters of rain, and the driest January, with 37 millimeters.

== Legend ==
According to Oupayou Gnaoué, the chief of the Trépo people, their village was originally on the site of Mont Niénokoué. One day the inselberg, fell from the sky onto the village, imprisoning the inhabitants underneath it. Since then, each generation has performed a ceremony imploring the ancestors to bless the population with happiness and success.
