= Phu Thok =

Hill in Thailand

- ภูทอก
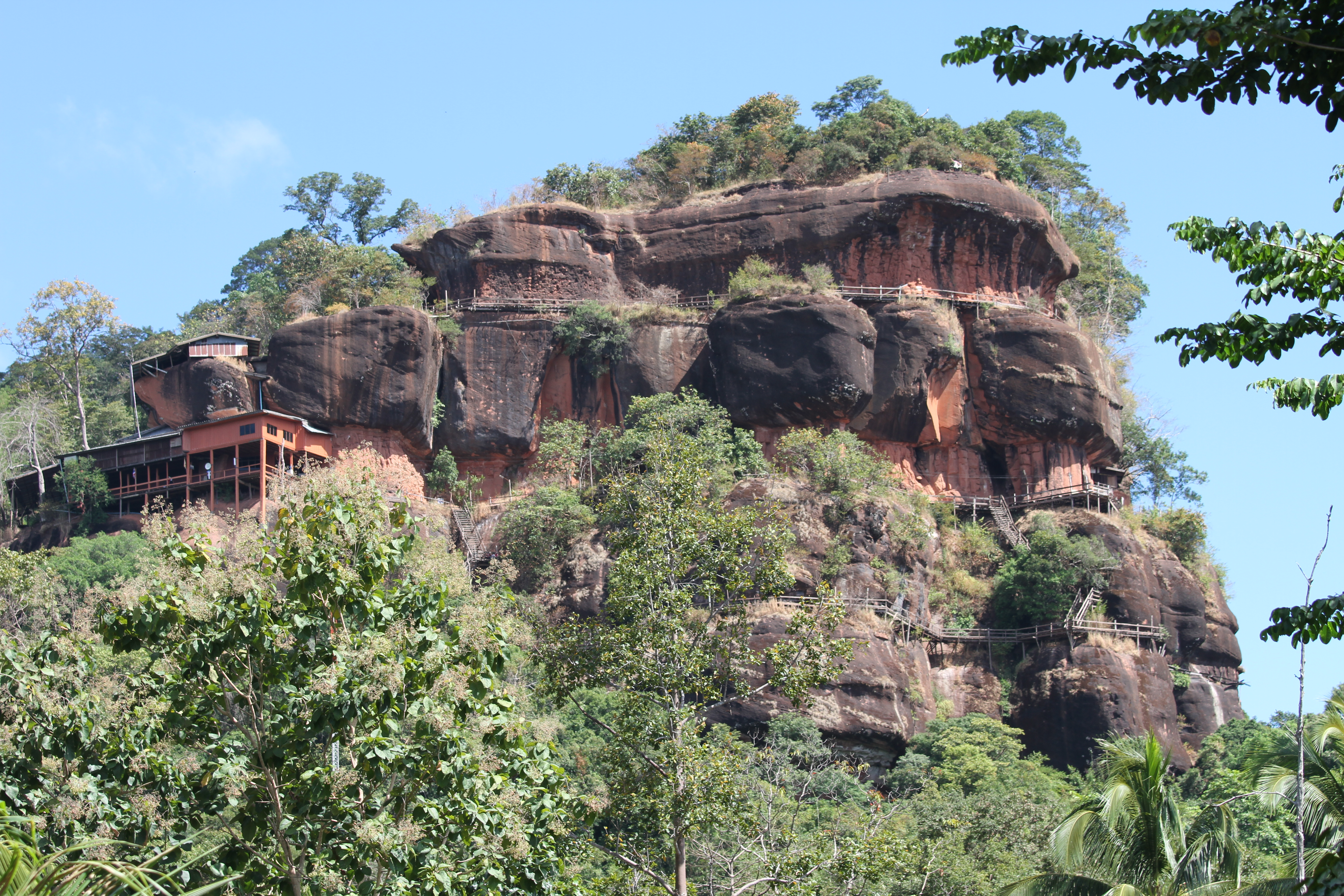

Highest point
- Elevation: 359 m (1,178 ft)
- Listing: List of mountains in Thailand
- Coordinates: 18°8′15″N 103°52′45″E

Geography
- Location within Thailand
- Location: Bueng Kan, Thailand

Geology
- Mountain type: Inselberg

Climbing
- Easiest route: drive and walk

Phu Thok (ภูทอก, also spelled Phu Tok), meaning 'lonely mountain' in the Isan language, is a 359 m high isolated hill in the northeastern end of Isan, Thailand. It is in Na Sabaeng Subdistrict, Si Wilai District, at the centre of Bueng Kan Province.

== Geography ==
Phu Thok is an emblematic sandstone outcrop that is both a local landmark and the symbol of the province of Bueng Kan. It appears in somewhat stylized form in the provincial seal.

Phu Thok has two peaks, Phu Thok Yai and Phu Thok Noi. Wat Phu Thok, an important Buddhist temple, is in a cave near the top of the smaller peak. The summit of this massive rocky hill can be reached via a wooden walkway. The top has views of the surrounding flat countryside.

Provincial seal of Bueng Kan featuring Phu Thok

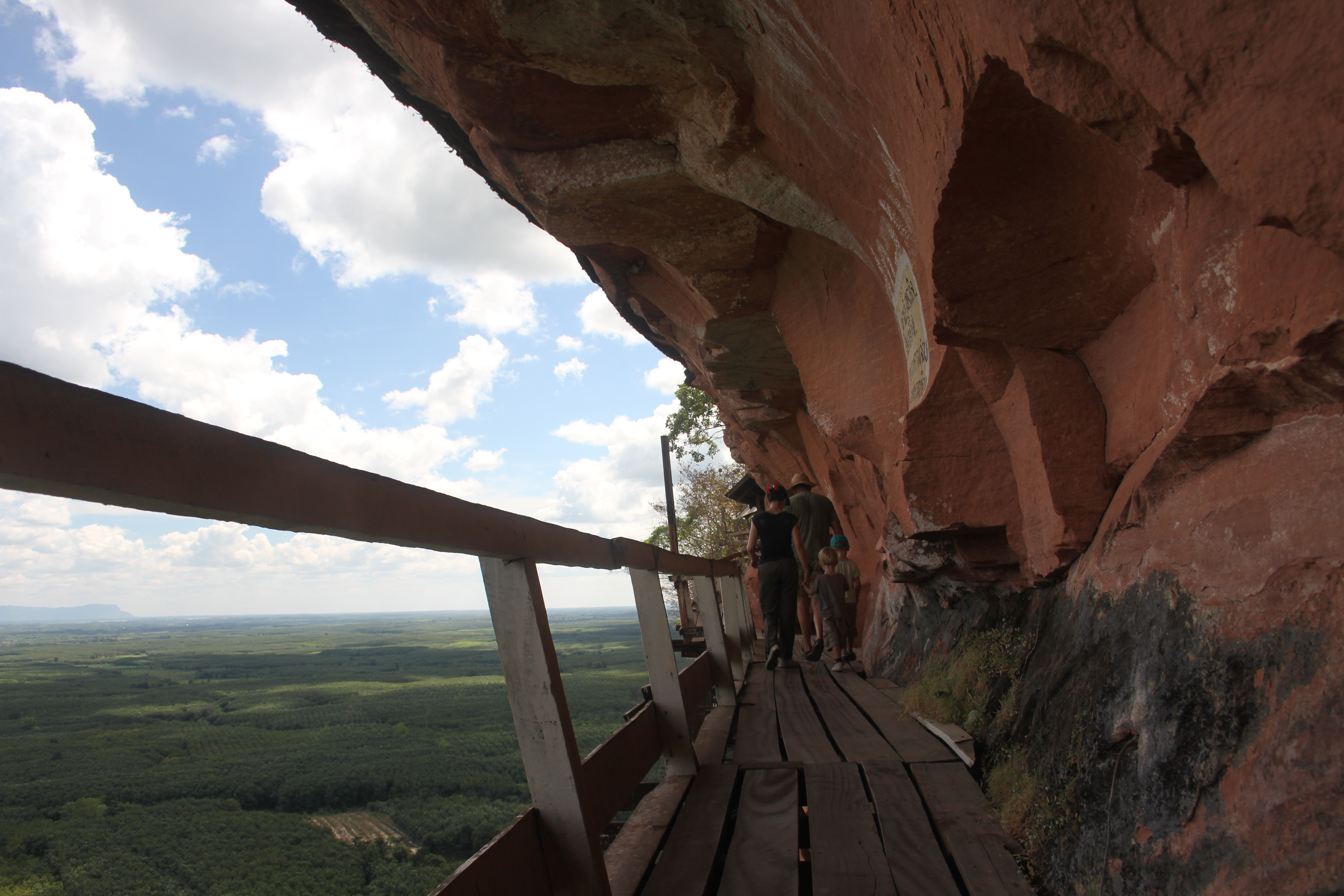
Walkway and landscape on the north side

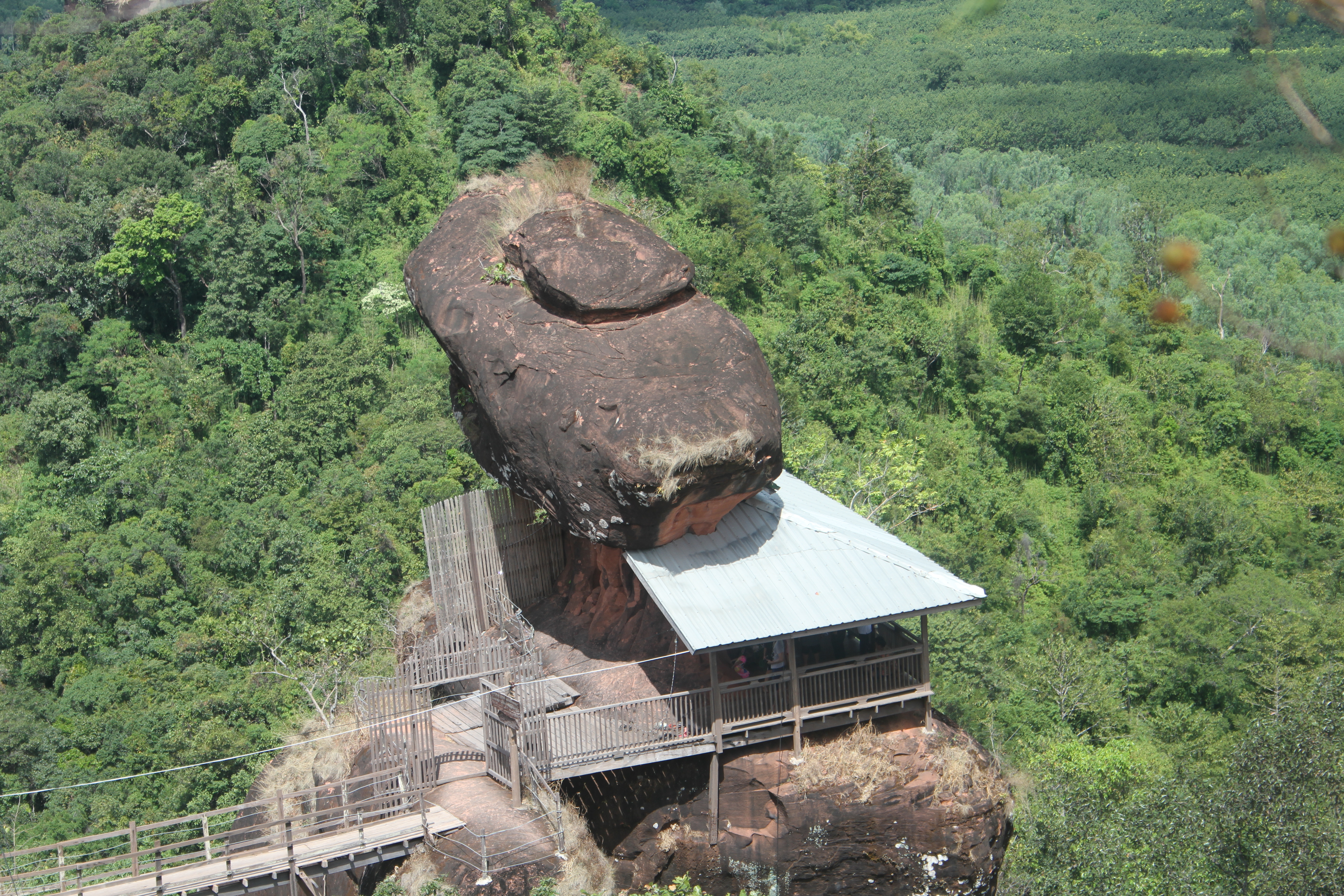
Rock formation from the summit

== See also ==
- List of mountains in Thailand
- Seals of the provinces of Thailand
- Bueng Kan Province
