= Mount Oxley (New South Wales) =

Mountain in New South Wales, Australia

- Aboriginal: Oombi Oombi
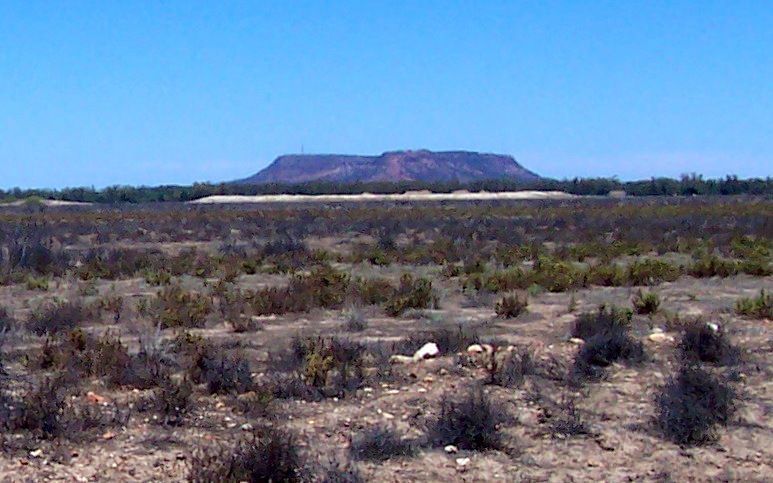

Highest point
- Elevation: 307 m (1,007 ft)
- Coordinates: 30°11.968′S 146°14.377′E

Geography
- Location within New South Wales
- Location: Far West region of New South Wales in outback Australia
- Country: Australia
- State: nsw

Geology
- Rock age: Cretaceous
- Mountain type: Sedimentary

Mount Oxley (Aboriginal: Oombi Oombi) is a hill situated 32 kilometres (20 mi) from Bourke in the Far West region of New South Wales in outback Australia.

The hill appears as a mesa-like inselberg, rising 150 metres (490 ft) above the Western Plains. It is a small relic of a formerly large sedimentary rock formation, mostly now eroded away. The underlying and surrounding rocks are sedimentary sandstone and metamorphic quartzite.

The first European to visit the mountain was Charles Sturt in December 1828. He mentioned "a report as of a gun discharge" near Mount Oxley. He surmised "it might be some gaseous explosion".

== Etymology ==
Named after the explorer John Oxley, the mountain is known as Oombi Oombi to the Indigenous Australians. Archaeological evidence suggested that they quarried the area for grinding stones. Stones from Mount Oxley were highly regarded and expensive, and reportedly managed by indigenous elders.

== Flora and fauna ==
Plants growing here have adapted to the semi-arid climate. They include species of Acacia, the desert bloodwood, weeping pittosporum and leopardwood. Wildflowers of the daisy family are prominent after rain. Animals seen here include western grey kangaroo and feral goats. Wedge-tailed eagles are often seen flying above the mountain.

== Geology ==
A number of small crater-like rocky formations may be seen in two distinct lines on the top part of the hill. There is ongoing speculation regarding their formation. The most likely explanation for the speculated 'huge steam vents', explosions and craters is geological. Other theories include meteors, evil spirits, omens, artillery, animals or unidentified human activity. Charles Sturt's exploring party reached there in January 1828 and recorded a description of the curious craters:

"Oxley's Table Land is situated in lat. 29° 57´ 30´´, and in E. long. 145° 43´ 30´´, the mean variation being 6.32 easterly. It consists of two hills that appear to have been rent asunder by some convulsion of nature, since the passage between them is narrow and their inner faces are equally perpendicular. The hill which I have named after the late Surveyor-general, is steep on all sides; but the other gradually declines from the south, and at length loses itself in a large plain that extends to the north. It is from four to five miles in length, and is picturesque in appearance, and lightly wooded. A few cypresses were growing on Oxley's Table Land; but it had, otherwise, very little timber upon its summit. Both hills are of sandstone formation, and there are some hollows upon the last that deserve particular notice. They have the appearance of having been formed by eddies of water, being deeper in the centre than at any other part, and contain fragments and slabs of sandstone of various size and breadth, without a particle of soil or of sand between them. It is to be observed that the edges of these slabs, which were perfect parallelograms, were unbroken, and that they were as clean as if they had only just been turned out of the hand of the mason. We counted thirteen of these hollows in one spot about twenty-five feet in diameter, but they are without doubt of periodical formation, since a single hollow was observed lower than the summit of the hill upon its south extremity, that had evidently long been exposed to the action of the atmosphere, and had a general coating of moss over it."

Mount Oxley has been mooted as a site for a seven-turbine 18 megawatts (24,000 hp) wind farm.

== See also ==
- List of mountains in Australia § New South Wales
