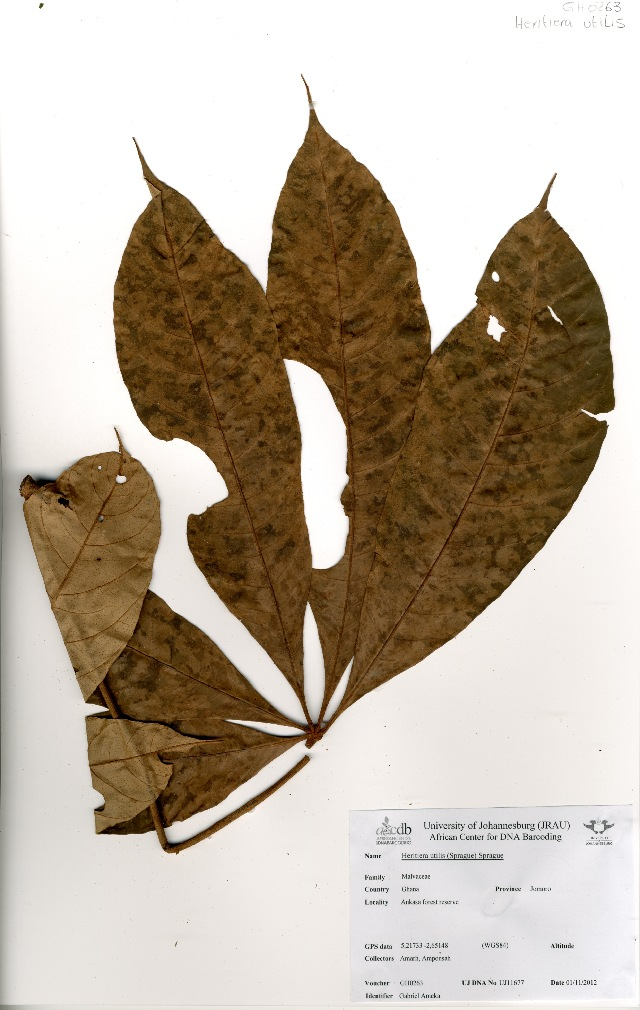
- Herbarium specimen
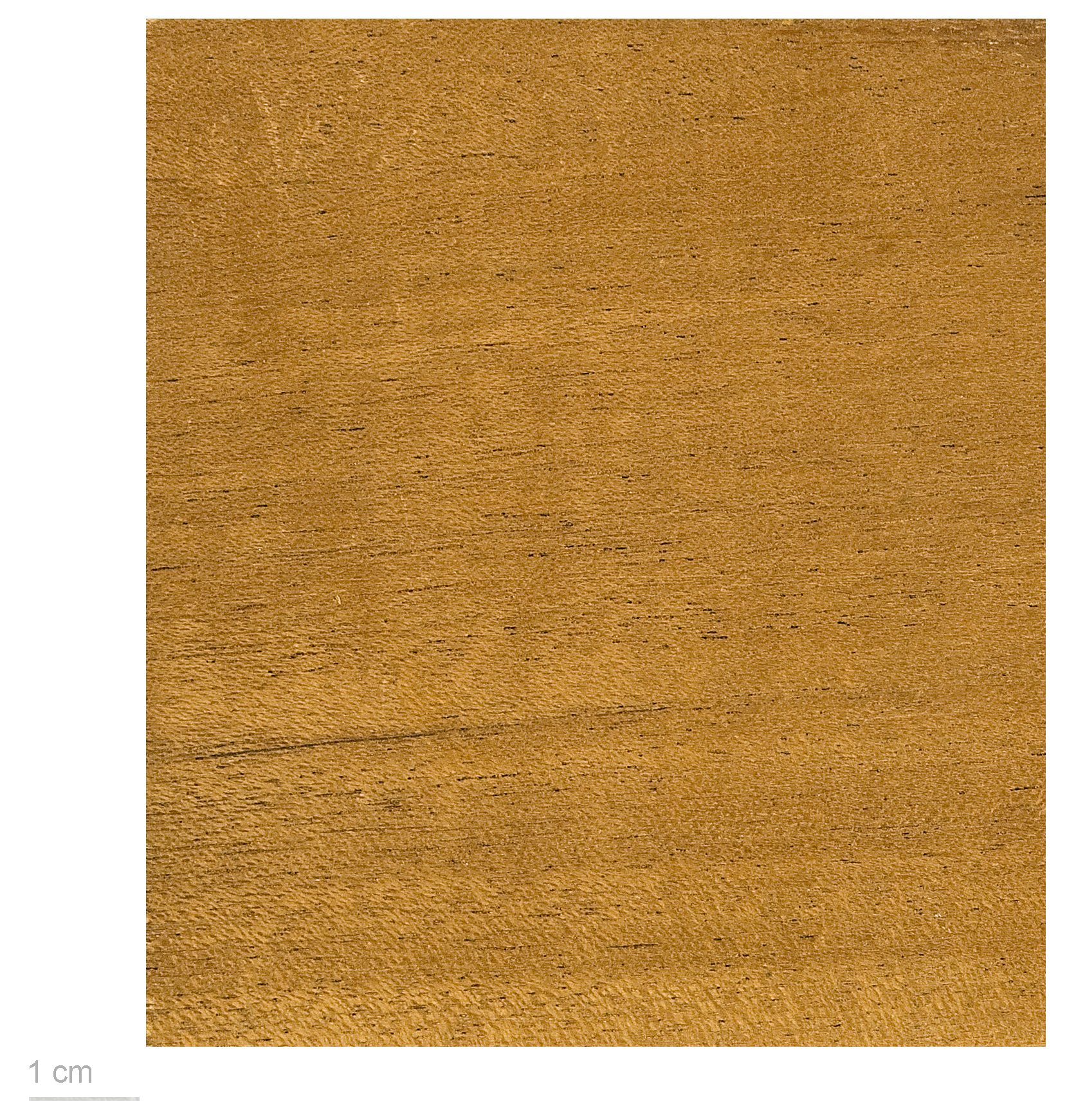
- Wood

Conservation status
- Vulnerable (IUCN 2.3)

Scientific classification
- Kingdom: Plantae
- Clade: Tracheophytes
- Clade: Angiosperms
- Clade: Eudicots
- Clade: Rosids
- Order: Malvales
- Family: Malvaceae
- Genus: Heritiera
- Species: H. utilis

Binomial name
- Heritiera utilis (Sprague) Sprague

Synonyms
- Tarrietia utilis (Sprague) Sprague; Triplochiton utile Sprague

= Heritiera utilis =

Species of flowering plant

Heritiera utilis is a species of flowering plant in the family Malvaceae (or Sterculiaceae). It is found in Ivory Coast, Gabon, Ghana, Liberia, and Sierra Leone. It is threatened by habitat loss.
