= Meruda Takkar =

Landform in Kutch, Gujarat, India

Meruda Takkar Meruda Hill, Meruda island
- Outcrop
- Interactive map of Meruda Takkar
- Coordinates: 24.132318°N 70.310295°E
- Age: Precambrian or Pre-Deccan Mesozoic plutonic
- Geology: Alkali feldspar syenite

Dimensions
  - Length: 200 metres (660 ft)
  - Width: 90 metres (300 ft)
- Elevation: 15 m (49 ft)
- Location: Great Rann of Kutch, Kutch district, Gujarat, India

Meruda Takkar is a landform located north of Khadir Bet in the Great Rann of Kutch, Kutch district, Gujarat, India. It has a presence of alkali feldspar syenite rocks which are of either Precambrian or Pre-Deccan Mesozoic plutonic origin. It is described as a hill, an island, an outcrop as well as a monadnock.

== Location ==
Meruda Takkar is located in the salt flats in the Great Rann of Kutch, about 21 km north of Cheriya Bet of Khadir. It is between Khadir Bet in Kutch and Tharparkar in Pakistan. Kori creek is located on its west and the Sui village on the east. It is located in a desolate and militarily sensitive area controlled by the Border Security Force. It is located on the Nagarparkar Fault.

== Geology ==
Meruda Takkar is 200 metres long and 90 metres wide in size and has an elevation of 15 metres. These rocks are formed of alkali feldspar syenite having nepheline and aegirine along with many fine-to-medium grained felsic dykes. The study proposes two viewpoints of their possible origin. The Precambrian origin is proposed based on their closeness with Trans Aravalli Belt anorogenic felsic magmatism. The Pre-Deccan Mesozoic plutonic origin is proposed based to their genesis similar to other rocks such as at Nir Wandh in Pachchham Island, and Mundwara and Sarnu–Dandali complexes in Rajasthan.

Based on the presence of the syenite at the site; it is assumed that the syenite rocks form the basement for the Kutch Basin sediments. After 180 million years-long erosion, the Meruda Takkar and Nagarparkar hills are the only existing Syenite rocks in the region. The Jurassic and Cretaceous rocks forms the mainland and other uplands of Kutch while the upper layer are formed by 1500–2500 million years-old hard and crystalline rocks of Aravalli hill range.

== Exploration history ==
The site was visited in 1968. Forty-eight years later, a team from the geology department of the Kutch University visited the site in May 2019.
