= Greeley, Kansas =

City in Anderson County, Kansas

- City
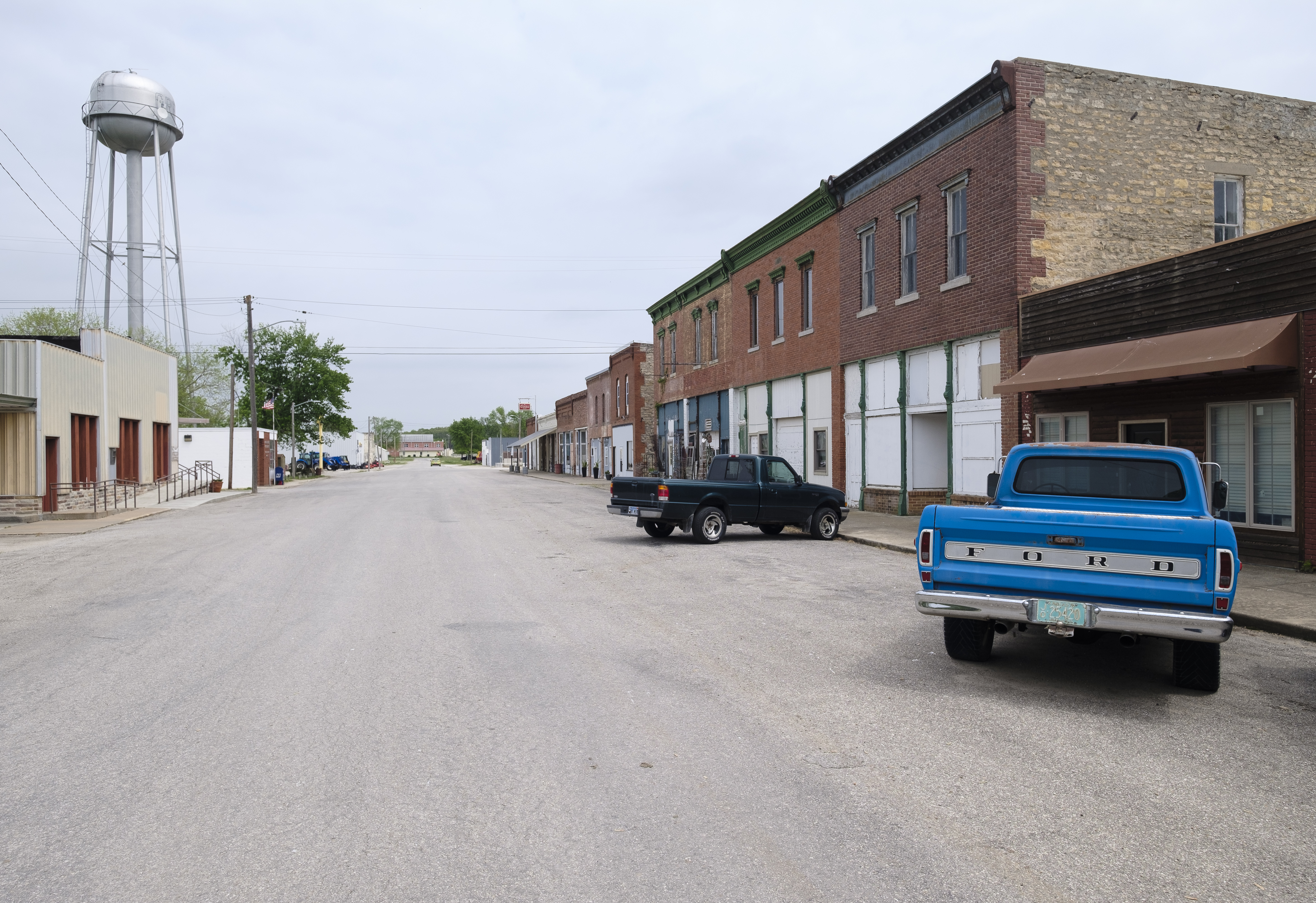
- Downtown (2022)

- Logo

- Location within Anderson County and Kansas

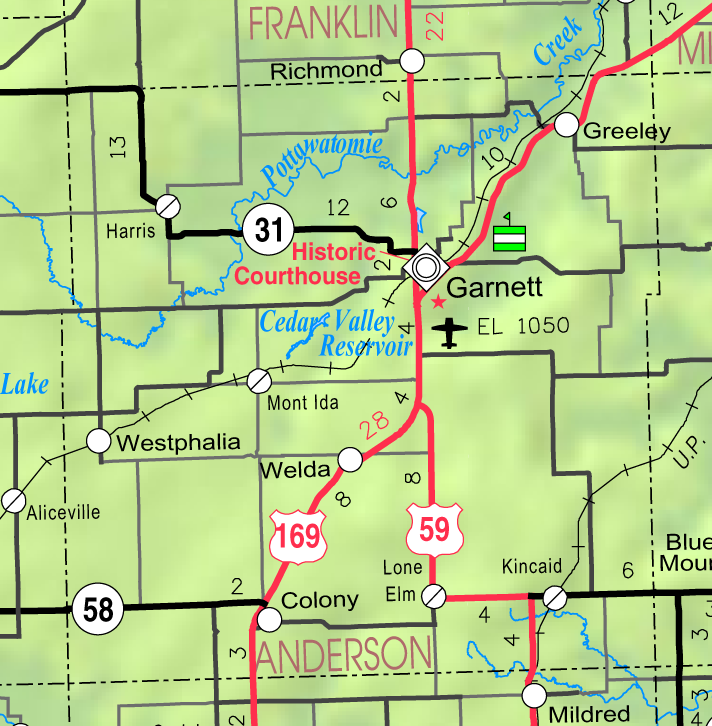
- KDOT map of Anderson County (legend)
- Coordinates: 38°22′03″N 95°07′35″W
- Country: United States
- State: Kansas
- County: Anderson
- Township: Walker
- Founded: 1854
- Incorporated: 1881
- Named for: Horace Greeley

Area
  - Total: 0.35 sq mi (0.91 km^{2})
  - Land: 0.34 sq mi (0.89 km^{2})
  - Water: 0.0077 sq mi (0.02 km^{2})
- Elevation: 896 ft (273 m)

Population (2020)
  - Total: 273
  - Density: 790/sq mi (310/km^{2})
- Time zone: UTC-6 (CST)
  - Summer (DST): UTC-5 (CDT)
- ZIP Code: 66033
- Area code: 785
- FIPS code: 20-28350
- GNIS ID: 2394972
- Website: greeleyks.org

Greeley is a city in Walker Township, Anderson County, Kansas, United States. As of the 2020 census, the population of the city was 273.

== History ==
=== Early history ===
Nomadic Native Americans, perhaps the Wichita as early as the 1400s and the Osage by the 1700s, would have been present in the area for many centuries. The Trail of Death relocated the Potawatomie to the area in 1838, and they had established subsistence farming at what would become Greeley prior to the arrival of European-Americans.

The first European-American settlement at Greeley was made in May 1854 by Valentine Gerth and Francis Myer. Though the town of Greeley had not yet been established, Myer's cabin served as Anderson County's temporary county seat from August 1855 through the county's first Territorial District Court session in April 1856. At that time the county seat moved to its first "permanent" location at what would become the town of Shannon.

Greeley was laid out in December 1856 by several Free Staters and named for Horace Greeley. Likely unique among American frontier towns, the three officers of the original Greeley Town Company were all Ashkenazi Jews: August Bondi, Jacob Benjamin, and Theodore Wiener (sometimes misspelled Weiner, or even Weimar in later texts).

The post office was established in May 1857, though not without some controversy. Postal officials in the Buchanan Administration apparently objected to naming the office after an abolitionist newspaperman, so instead used the name of Buchannan-appointed Territorial Governor Robert J. Walker. The office was called Walker until it relocated to the competing town of Mount Gilead, Kansas in May 1861. The postal name Greeley was not used until April 1866 when the Mount Gilead townsite failed and the post office returned to its original location.

The St. Louis, Kansas and Arizona Railway (a division of the Missouri Pacific) reached Greeley in 1879, and today operates as part of the Union Pacific Railroad.

Greeley was incorporated as a city in 1881.

=== 20th century ===
In 1901 Arizona cattle baron Colin Cameron established his midwestern operations just east of Greeley. Cameron's Fields of Lochiel ranch served as the finishing operation for his San Rafael Ranch Herefords prior to sale in Kansas City, Missouri.

== Geography ==
Greeley is located in the Pottawatomie Valley near the confluence of the North Fork and South Fork of Pottawatomie Creek.

According to the United States Census Bureau, the city has a total area of 0.37 square miles (0.96 km^{2}), of which 0.36 square miles (0.93 km^{2}) is land and 0.01 square miles (0.03 km^{2}) is water.

=== Street names ===
Several of Greeley's east–west streets are named for Free Staters who were Jayhawkers or were involved in Territorial government during the Bleeding Kansas era.

- Cochran Street - Named for Benjamin L. Cochran, a town founder who had been involved in the Wakarusa War, the Battle of Black Jack, and was a member of the Pottawatomie Rifles.
- Kaiser Avenue - Named for Charles Kaiser, a Bavarian immigrant who was seriously wounded in the Battle of Osawatomie, taken prisoner, and assassinated by his Border Ruffian captors near Olathe, Kansas.
- Brown Avenue - Greeley's primary commercial street, named for John Brown.
- Bondi Avenue - Named for August Bondi, a town founder who fought in the Battle of Black Jack and was a member of the Pottawatomie Rifles.
- Mitchell Avenue - Named for Robert B. Mitchell, who represented Linn County in the Territorial Legislature and was a delegate to the Leavenworth constitutional convention.

=== Climate ===
The climate in this area is characterized by hot, humid summers and generally mild to cool winters. According to the Köppen Climate Classification system, Greeley has a humid subtropical climate, abbreviated "Cfa" on climate maps.

== Demographics ==
Historical population
Census	Pop.	Note	%±
1870	145		—
1880	285		96.6%
1890	514		80.4%
1900	394		−23.3%
1910	492		24.9%
1920	496		0.8%
1930	504		1.6%
1940	387		−23.2%
1950	436		12.7%
1960	415		−4.8%
1970	368		−11.3%
1980	405		10.1%
1990	339		−16.3%
2000	327		−3.5%
2010	302		−7.6%
2020	273		−9.6%
U.S. Decennial Census

=== 2020 census ===
The 2020 United States census counted 273 people, 124 households, and 57 families in Greeley. The population density was 793.6 per square mile (306.4/km^{2}). There were 142 housing units at an average density of 412.8 per square mile (159.4/km^{2}). The racial makeup was 95.24% (260) white or European American (94.14% non-Hispanic white), 0.0% (0) black or African-American, 0.37% (1) Native American or Alaska Native, 0.73% (2) Asian, 0.0% (0) Pacific Islander or Native Hawaiian, 0.0% (0) from other races, and 3.66% (10) from two or more races. Hispanic or Latino of any race was 1.47% (4) of the population.

Of the 124 households, 25.8% had children under the age of 18; 32.3% were married couples living together; 29.8% had a female householder with no spouse or partner present. 48.4% of households consisted of individuals and 25.8% had someone living alone who was 65 years of age or older. The average household size was 2.2 and the average family size was 2.5. The percent of those with a bachelor's degree or higher was estimated to be 11.0% of the population.

24.9% of the population was under the age of 18, 7.0% from 18 to 24, 24.2% from 25 to 44, 24.9% from 45 to 64, and 19.0% who were 65 years of age or older. The median age was 40.9 years. For every 100 females, there were 118.4 males. For every 100 females ages 18 and older, there were 103.0 males.

The 2016–2020 5-year American Community Survey estimates show that the median household income was $51,136 (with a margin of error of +/- $8,926) and the median family income was $51,818 (+/- $15,783). Males had a median income of $32,250 (+/- $15,495) versus $26,591 (+/- $9,503) for females. The median income for those above 16 years old was $30,104 (+/- $10,085). Approximately, 8.0% of families and 12.4% of the population were below the poverty line, including 9.3% of those under the age of 18 and 1.4% of those ages 65 or over.

=== 2010 census ===
As of the census of 2010, there were 302 people, 132 households, and 84 families residing in the city. The population density was 838.9 inhabitants per square mile (323.9/km^{2}). There were 152 housing units at an average density of 422.2 per square mile (163.0/km^{2}). The racial makeup of the city was 97.4% White, 0.3% African American, 0.3% Native American, 0.3% Asian, 1.0% from other races, and 0.7% from two or more races. Hispanic or Latino of any race were 0.7% of the population.

There were 132 households, of which 29.5% had children under the age of 18 living with them, 47.7% were married couples living together, 6.1% had a female householder with no husband present, 9.8% had a male householder with no wife present, and 36.4% were non-families. 33.3% of all households were made up of individuals, and 18.9% had someone living alone who was 65 years of age or older. The average household size was 2.29 and the average family size was 2.85.

The median age in the city was 38.3 years. 24.8% of residents were under the age of 18; 5.9% were between the ages of 18 and 24; 26% were from 25 to 44; 23.2% were from 45 to 64; and 19.9% were 65 years of age or older. The gender makeup of the city was 51.3% male and 48.7% female.

=== 2000 census ===
As of the census of 2000, there were 327 people, 134 households, and 88 families residing in the city. The population density was 864.7 inhabitants per square mile (333.9/km^{2}). There were 144 housing units at an average density of 380.8 per square mile (147.0/km^{2}). The racial makeup of the city was 99.69% White, and 0.31% from two or more races. Hispanic or Latino of any race were 0.61% of the population.

There were 134 households, out of which 31.3% had children under the age of 18 living with them, 55.2% were married couples living together, 5.2% had a female householder with no husband present, and 34.3% were non-families. 26.1% of all households were made up of individuals, and 12.7% had someone living alone who was 65 years of age or older. The average household size was 2.44 and the average family size was 3.01.

In the city, the population was spread out, with 27.8% under the age of 18, 8.0% from 18 to 24, 28.4% from 25 to 44, 20.2% from 45 to 64, and 15.6% who were 65 years of age or older. The median age was 34 years. For every 100 females, there were 104.4 males. For every 100 females age 18 and over, there were 101.7 males.

The median income for a household in the city was $39,063, and the median income for a family was $43,393. Males had a median income of $35,556 versus $18,750 for females. The per capita income for the city was $24,591. About 7.1% of families and 8.3% of the population were below the poverty line, including 16.9% of those under age 18 and 6.3% of those age 65 or over.

== Education ==
The community is served by Garnett USD 365 public school district, and operates Greeley Elementary School in Greeley and Anderson County Junior-Senior High School in Garnett.

== Notable people ==
- James G. Blunt, Anderson County delegate to the Wyandotte constitutional convention and highest ranking Kansan in the Union Army, farmed west of Greeley "in the forks of Pottawatomie" and attempted to establish the competing community of Mount Gilead prior to the Civil War.
- Dale Gear, Major League Baseball player for parts of three seasons.

== See also ==
- National Register of Historic Places listings in Anderson County, Kansas
