= Pottawatomie Creek =

Stream in the US state of Missouri

Pottawatomie Creek is a stream in Miami, Franklin, Anderson and Coffey counties of east central Kansas. The stream headwaters arise in northeast Coffey County approximately 3.7 miles (6.0 km) southeast of the community of Waverly at 38°20′48″N 95°34′35″W and an elevation of approximately 1,215 feet (370 m). The stream flows to the south-southeast for 6.2 miles (10.0 km) and enters Anderson County and turns to the northeast passing under State Highway K-31.The stream passes under K-31 again about seven miles (11 km) west of Garnett then passes 1.5 miles (2.4 km) southeast of the community of Pottawatomie. It continues to the northeast passing under US Highway 59 approximately 3.2 miles (5.1 km) north of Garnett. It continues to the northeast passing northwest of Greeley and into southeast Franklin County. It then passes Lane and enters Miami County. It flows to the east-northeast passing the south side of Osawatomie and under U.S. Route 169 to its confluence with the Marais des Cygnes River just east of Osawatomie. The confluence is at 38°29′48″N 94°55′38″W and an elevation of 817 feet (249 m).

The Pottawatomie massacre of May 24–25, 1856 occurred on the banks of Pottawatomie Creek.

== See also ==
- Spencer's Crossing Bridge, a bridge which crosses Pottawatomie Creek
