= Westphalia (disambiguation) =

Westphalia is a region in Germany, known as Westfalen in German.

Westphalia may also refer to:

== Places ==
=== Germany ===
- Duchy of Westphalia
- Kingdom of Westphalia
- North Rhine-Westphalia
- Province of Westphalia

=== United States ===
- Westphalia, Indiana, an unincorporated community
- Westphalia, Iowa, a town
- Westphalia, Kansas, a town
- Westphalia, Maryland, an unincorporated community
- Westphalia, Michigan, a village
- Westphalia, Missouri, a town
- Westphalia, Texas, an unincorporated community
  - Westphalia Rural Historic District, located around Westphalia, Texas

== Other uses ==
- Peace of Westphalia
- Westphalia Waltz
- SMS Westfalen

== See also ==
- Westphalia Township (disambiguation)
- Westphalian (disambiguation)
- Westphalen
- Westfalia, the name given to various camper vans
- Westfalia-Werke a company in Germany
