= Westphalia Township =

Westphalia Township may refer to the following places:

- Westphalia Township, Shelby County, Iowa
- Westphalia Township, Anderson County, Kansas
- Westphalia Township, Clinton County, Michigan

See also

- Westphalia (disambiguation)
