= Westphalen =

Westphalen is a German surname. It may refer to:

== People ==
- Ferdinand von Westphalen (1799–1876), German politician
- Jenny von Westphalen, wife of German philosopher Karl Marx
- Jens Westphalen (born 1964), German wildlife filmmaker, director and film producer
- Judith Westphalen, Peruvian painter
- Karl von Westphalen, German politician
- Ludwig von Westphalen, liberal German government official
- Marc Westphalen, German sprint canoer
- Otto Westphalen, German naval officer

=== Fictional ===
- Kristin Westphalen, character in SeaQuest DSV

== Places ==
- Frederico Westphalen, city in Brazil
  - Roman Catholic Diocese of Frederico Westphalen
- Westphalia or Westfalia is a region in Germany.

== Science ==
- Westphalen-Lettré rearrangement
