= Ennis Whitehead =

United States Air Force general

Ennis Clement Whitehead
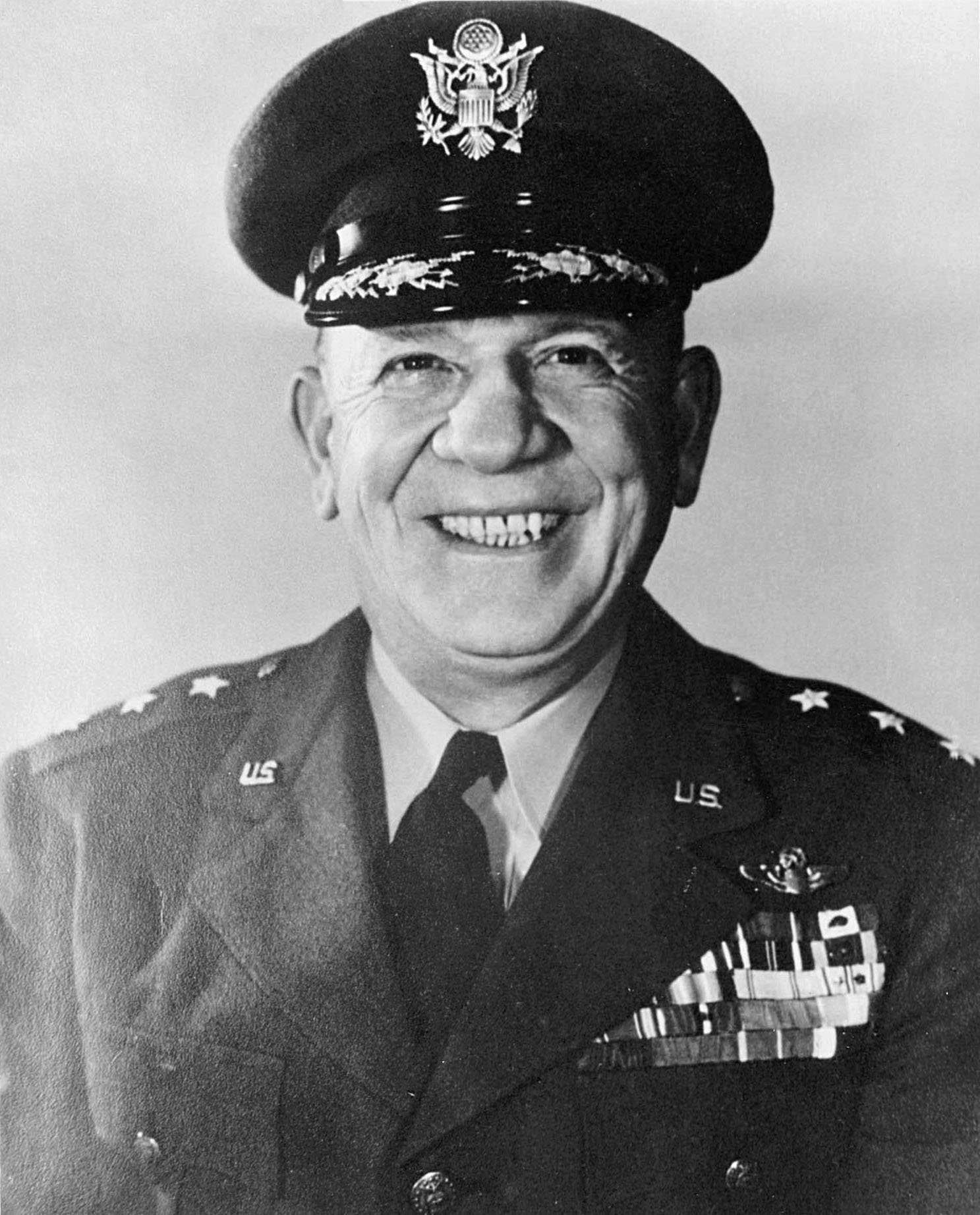
- Lieutenant General Ennis C. Whitehead
- Born: September 3, 1895; Westphalia, Kansas
- Died: October 12, 1964 (aged 69); Newton, Kansas
- Burial place: Arlington National Cemetery
- Military career
- Allegiance: United States of America
- Branch: United States Air Force; United States Army
- Service years: 1917–1951
- Rank: Lieutenant General
- Nickname: Ennis the Menace
- Service number: 0-10572/A
- Commands: 94th Pursuit Squadron; 36th Pursuit Squadron; Fifth Air Force; Continental Air Command; Air Defense Command
- Conflicts: World War I World War II: New Guinea campaign; Philippines Campaign (1944–45); Korean War
- Awards: Distinguished Service Cross; Distinguished Service Medal (3); Silver Star; Distinguished Flying Cross; Air Medal (2); Commander of the Order of the British Empire

Ennis Clement Whitehead (September 3, 1895 – October 12, 1964) was an early United States Army aviator and a United States Army Air Forces general during World War II. Whitehead joined the U. S. Army after the United States entered World War I in 1917. He trained as an aviator and served in France, where he was posted to the 3d Aviation Instruction Center and became a qualified test pilot. After the war, Whitehead returned to school at the University of Kansas. After he graduated, he was commissioned as a first lieutenant in 1920.

Over the following twenty years, Whitehead participated in Billy Mitchell's aerial bombing demonstration and served as commander of the 94th and 36th Pursuit Squadrons among other assignments. After the U.S. entered World War II, Whitehead was promoted to brigadier general and sent to the Southwest Pacific Area. In the course of the war, he earned a Distinguished Service Cross and was named an honorary Commander of the Order of the British Empire as he rose to command the Fifth Air Force.

After the war, he commanded the Far East Air Forces, the Continental Air Command, and the Air Defense Command. He retired in 1951 after he was passed over for Vice Chief of Staff of the United States Air Force. Both his son, Ennis Whitehead Jr., and his grandson, Ennis Whitehead III, became generals as well, rising to major general and brigadier general respectively.

== Early life ==
Whitehead was born on a farm near Westphalia, Kansas, on September 3, 1895, the eldest of three children of J. E. Whitehead, a farmer, and his wife Celia. He was educated at Glenwood District School and Burlington High School. In 1914, he entered the University of Kansas, intending to obtain a law degree.

== World War I ==
His plans were changed by the United States' entry into World War I during April 1917. Whitehead enlisted on August 16, 1917, as a private in the Aviation Section, Signal Enlisted Reserve Corps at Fort Riley, Kansas. On February 10, 1918, he became an aviation cadet, training at a wartime Army School of Military Aeronautics at the University of Illinois at Urbana-Champaign and at an Air Service flight school at Chanute Field, Illinois. He qualified for a rating of "Reserve Military Aviator" on October 19, 1917, and was commissioned a first lieutenant, Signal Officer Reserve Corps. He sailed for France on November 14, 1917. There, he was posted to the 3rd Aviation Instruction Center at Issoudun for more training. He attended gunnery school at Bordeaux and became a test pilot. He spent the rest of the war as a test pilot.

== Between the wars ==
Whitehead was demobilized from the Army in January 1919, and returned to the University of Kansas, earning a Bachelor of Engineering degree in 1920. After graduation, he took a job with The Wichita Eagle as a reporter in order to earn enough money for law school. In the end though, he decided that he preferred flying. He applied for a commission in the Regular Army, and was re-commissioned as a first lieutenant in the Air Service, on September 11, 1920. On September 25, 1920, he married Mary Nicholson, whom he had known while at the University of Kansas. They had two children: a daughter, Margaret, born in 1921, who later became a lieutenant in the United States Air Force, and a son, Ennis C. Whitehead Jr., who was born in 1926 and graduated from West Point in 1948.

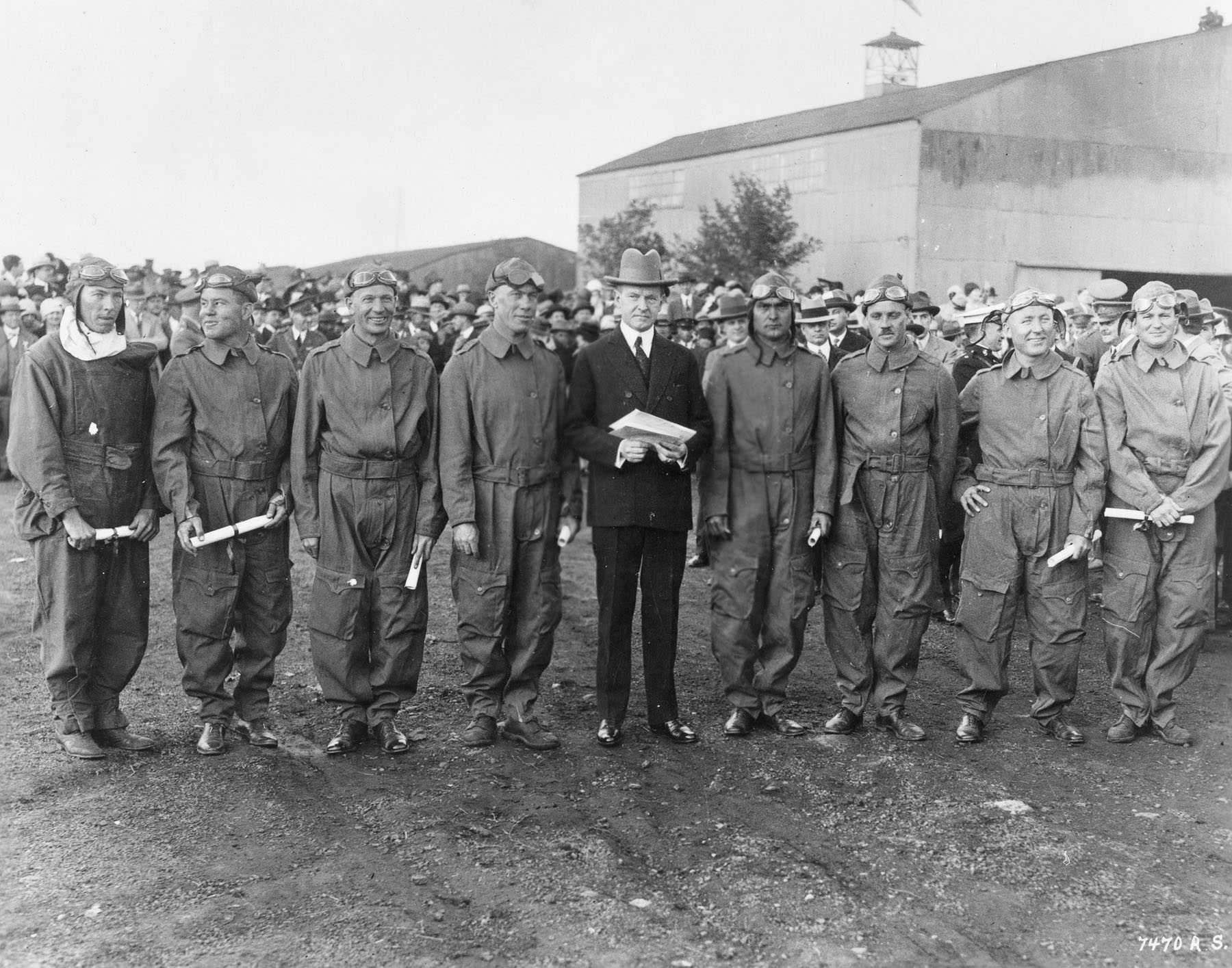
Pan American Flyers receive Distinguished Service Cross certificates from President Calvin Coolidge (center) on May 2, 1927. Herbert Dargue on the left; Whitehead is second from the left.

Whitehead was initially stationed at March Field, where he served as a flying instructor. In 1921, he was transferred to Kelly Field where he assumed command of the 94th Pursuit Squadron of the 1st Pursuit Group. On July 20, 1921, he participated in Brigadier General Billy Mitchell's demonstration bombing attack of the ex-German dreadnought Ostfriesland. The 1st Pursuit Group moved to Selfridge Field, Michigan in July 1922. In 1926, Whitehead attended the Air Service Engineering School at McCook Field, graduating first in his class.

In December 1926, Whitehead was assigned as the co-pilot for Major Herbert A. Dargue, leading the 22,000-mile (35,000 km) Pan American Good Will Flight touring South America. During a landing at Buenos Aires in March 1927, their aircraft, a Loening OA-1A float plane nicknamed New York, was involved in a mid-air collision with the Detroit, another OA-1A, forcing both Dargue and Whitehead to bail out. Whitehead suffered only a sprained ankle, but the pilot and co-pilot of the Detroit were killed. The remaining four planes of the flight completed the tour, for which all ten airmen including Whitehead received the first awards of the Distinguished Flying Cross.

After three years as an engineering officer with the Air Corps Materiel Division at Wright Field, Ohio, he attended the Air Corps Tactical School at Langley Field from September 1930 to June 1931. While there, he was promoted to captain. Returning to the 1st Pursuit Group, he took command of the 36th Pursuit Squadron. He did staff duty tours at Albrook Field, Panama Canal Zone with the 16th Pursuit Group, at Barksdale Field with the 20th Pursuit Group, and at the headquarters of the General Headquarters (GHQ) Air Force at Langley Field. He was promoted to temporary major in April 1935 and attended the Command and General Staff School at Fort Leavenworth in 1938.

== World War II ==
On graduation from the Command and General Staff School, Whitehead was posted to the G-2 (Intelligence) Division of the War Department. He was promoted to lieutenant colonel on December 3, 1940. In February 1941, he was transferred to Luke Field, a new training base, where he was promoted to colonel on January 5, 1942.

In May 1942, Lieutenant General George Brett, the Allied Air Forces commander in the South West Pacific Area (SWPA), lodged a request with Lieutenant General Henry H. Arnold, the Commanding General of the U.S. Army Air Forces, for Whitehead to be sent out in the grade of brigadier general as a replacement for Brigadier General Harold Huston George, who had been killed in an air crash near Darwin, Northern Territory on April 29, 1942. Whitehead was promoted on June 16, 1942, and ordered to the Southwest Pacific. He flew there with Kenneth Walker, a bomber expert, who had also recently been promoted to brigadier general. Arriving in Australia on July 11, 1942, Whitehead was shocked by the confusion and lack of organization he found. The next day, he reported to General Douglas MacArthur at GHQ SWPA in Melbourne; the two men would get along well. MacArthur later praised Whitehead for his "masterful generalship ... brilliant judgement and inexhaustible energy".

At this time, the stocks of the air force in SWPA were low. At the recent Battle of Milne Bay, a Japanese invasion force had managed to sail past all but a few RAAF P-40 Kittyhawk and Lockheed Hudson aircraft, suffering only limited damage. Opinion at MacArthur's General Headquarters (GHQ) was that "the failure of the Air in this situation is deplorable; it will encourage the enemy to attempt further landings, with the assurance of impunity". Unable to provide MacArthur with what he most needed—more and better aircraft and the crews to man them—Arnold decided to replace Brett with Major General George C. Kenney. Arnold hoped that Kenney and the two newly minted brigadier generals could make the best use of what was available. Major General George Kenney arrived in the theater on July 28. Kenney knew Whitehead well, having served with him at Issoudun, the Air Corps Tactical School and GHQ Air Force, and had also served with Walker at the Air Corps Tactical School. "I had known them both for over twenty years," Kenney later wrote. "They had brains, leadership, loyalty, and liked to work. If Brett had had them about three months earlier his luck might have been a lot better."

Kenney assumed command of the Allied Air Forces on August 4. Three days later, he instituted a sweeping reorganization of the Allied Air Forces. The Australian components were assigned to RAAF Command under Air Vice Marshal William Bostock, while the American components were consolidated into the reformed Fifth Air Force under Kenney's personal command. On paper, the organization followed the orthodox pattern, consisting of V Fighter Command under Brigadier General Paul Wurtsmith, V Bomber Command under Walker, and an Air Services Command under Major General Rush B. Lincoln. But Kenney realized that he would have to maintain his headquarters near MacArthur's GHQ, which moved to Brisbane on July 20, while the fighting was thousands of miles away in New Guinea, with the Fifth Air Force's principal forward bases around Port Moresby. Moreover, Walker's headquarters was in Townsville, as heavy and medium bombers were based there and only staged through Port Moresby. Accordingly, Kenney appointed Whitehead as deputy Fifth Air Force commander, and commander of the Advanced Echelon (ADVON) in Port Moresby.

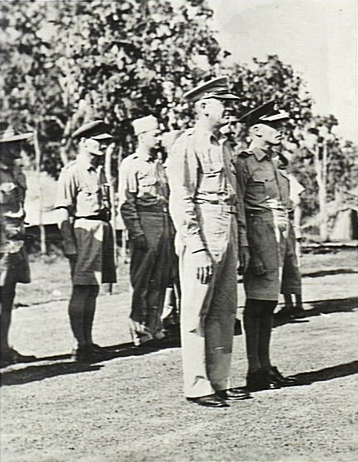
Major General Whitehead, New Guinea, 1943

In his first months in New Guinea, Whitehead concentrated on building up the infrastructure there. He obtained additional engineer units and construction equipment. New airfields were developed, along with roads, housing, taxiways and revetments to protect his aircraft from the frequent Japanese air raids. He also attempted to build up the morale and leadership of his units. These months coincided with the Kokoda Track campaign. For a time, despite the efforts of his airmen and the ground troops, the Japanese advanced steadily on Port Moresby, but they ultimately turned back short of it. For his part in the Papuan campaign, Whitehead was awarded the Distinguished Service Cross. The Australian government made him an honorary Commander of the Order of the British Empire.

Building up Allied air power required ingenuity, improvisation, and innovation. Skip bombing was a new tactic adopted by the Fifth Air Force that enabled its bombers to attack ships at low level. The parachute fragmentation (parafrag) bomb gave the light bombers increased accuracy for close air support missions. Although the B-25 Mitchell was originally designed to bomb from medium altitudes in level flight, Major Paul "Pappy" Gunn had additional guns installed in the nose of the aircraft to enable it to perform in a low-level strafing role. Whitehead consistently gave his full support to such innovations.

At the Battle of the Bismarck Sea in March 1943, Whitehead was rewarded with an important victory over the Japanese. The battle caused the Japanese to abandon all further attempts to bring supplies and reinforcements in to Lae by the direct sea route from Rabaul. Whitehead was promoted to major general on March 15, 1943.

Whitehead's attitude earned him high marks with the Allied land commanders. Lieutenant General Sir Iven Mackay, commander of New Guinea Force, reported on February 4, 1943, that "I have found Brigadier General Whitehead of the USAAF extremely cooperative. In fact there is no question of asking for help—he takes the initiative."

As the Allied offensive gained steam, Whitehead's main task was to shift his aircraft forward, advancing the bomb line incrementally towards Japan. When the P-38 Lightning arrived in the theater in late 1942, Whitehead at last received a fighter that could match the Japanese A6M Zero. To speed up the Allied advance, the Fifth Air Force developed a number of technical and tactical innovations that extended the range of its aircraft, thus increasing the distance of each Allied advance, which was dependent on the range of Whitehead's aircraft.

Whitehead assumed command of the Fifth Air Force in June 1944, although he remained subordinate to Kenney. In the Battle of Leyte, MacArthur attempted to move forward beyond the range of land-based aircraft. A long battle of attrition then began on the ground and in the air, as the Fifth Air Force struggled to gain the upper hand with inadequate numbers of aircraft that could be based on Leyte. Gradually, Whitehead gained the upper hand. He was promoted to lieutenant general on June 5, 1945.

== Post-war ==
Whitehead continued in command of the Fifth Air Force, participating in the occupation of Japan. He succeeded Kenney as commander of the Far East Air Forces in December 1945. He commanded it until March 1949, when he returned to the United States to command the Continental Air Command. Whitehead was instrumental in splitting this organization into the Tactical Air Command and Air Defense Command, commanding the latter from January 1951. He was seen by some in the Air Force hierarchy as "too attached to Kenney and MacArthur, too political, too outspoken, and too tactically focused" to be Vice Chief of Staff of the United States Air Force. Whitehead was dismayed by the appointment of Hoyt Vandenberg rather than Kenney as Chief of Staff of the United States Air Force in 1948 and lost his mentor when the new chief relieved Kenney as commander of Strategic Air Command in October 1948. Whitehead was also disappointed at not receiving a fourth star. These feelings, combined with ill health, caused him to retire on July 31, 1951.

In retirement, Whitehead testified before the United States Senate's Preparedness Subcommittee on the State of the Nation's Air Defenses. He pleaded for the fastest possible creation of an air force with an atomic "strike force" ready to take off on retaliatory raids within a few hours of an attack on the United States, enough transports to service the strike force at overseas bases, fighters to escort the bombers on their missions, and at least 30 wings of all-weather jet fighters to intercept enemy bombers. He urged that, until this was achieved, the Army and Navy should be cut back to "token" appropriations. Whitehead pointed out that the United States mainland was defended against atomic attack by fewer than 100 all-weather fighters, which could not have destroyed more than 10 to 15 percent of a force attacking in daylight. At night, or during instrument meteorological conditions, interceptors would have shot down less than 5 percent. He argued that a well-executed surprise atomic air attack would likely succeed.

He died of emphysema in Newton, Kansas, on October 12, 1964, and was buried in Arlington National Cemetery. His son, Ennis Whitehead Jr., later became a major general in the U.S. Army in the late 1970s, and in March 2003, his grandson Ennis Whitehead III was promoted to brigadier general in the Army Reserve, making three generations of general officers.
