= German Club =

German Club may refer to:

- German Club, Sydney, a former gentlemen's club in Australia
- German Club, Adelaide, any of several organizations in Australia
- German Club (Bangkok) (Deutscher Klub), a former social club on Surawong Road in Bangkok, Thailand
- German Club (fraternity), a college social fraternity at Virginia Tech in the United States
- German Club 1954 (Deutscher Klub 1954), a neutralist political group in 1950s West Germany

== See also ==
- Germania Club
- Football in Germany
- List of football clubs in Germany
