= Church of the Visitation (Westphalia, Texas) =

Historic church in Texas, United States

- U.S. Historic district – Contributing property
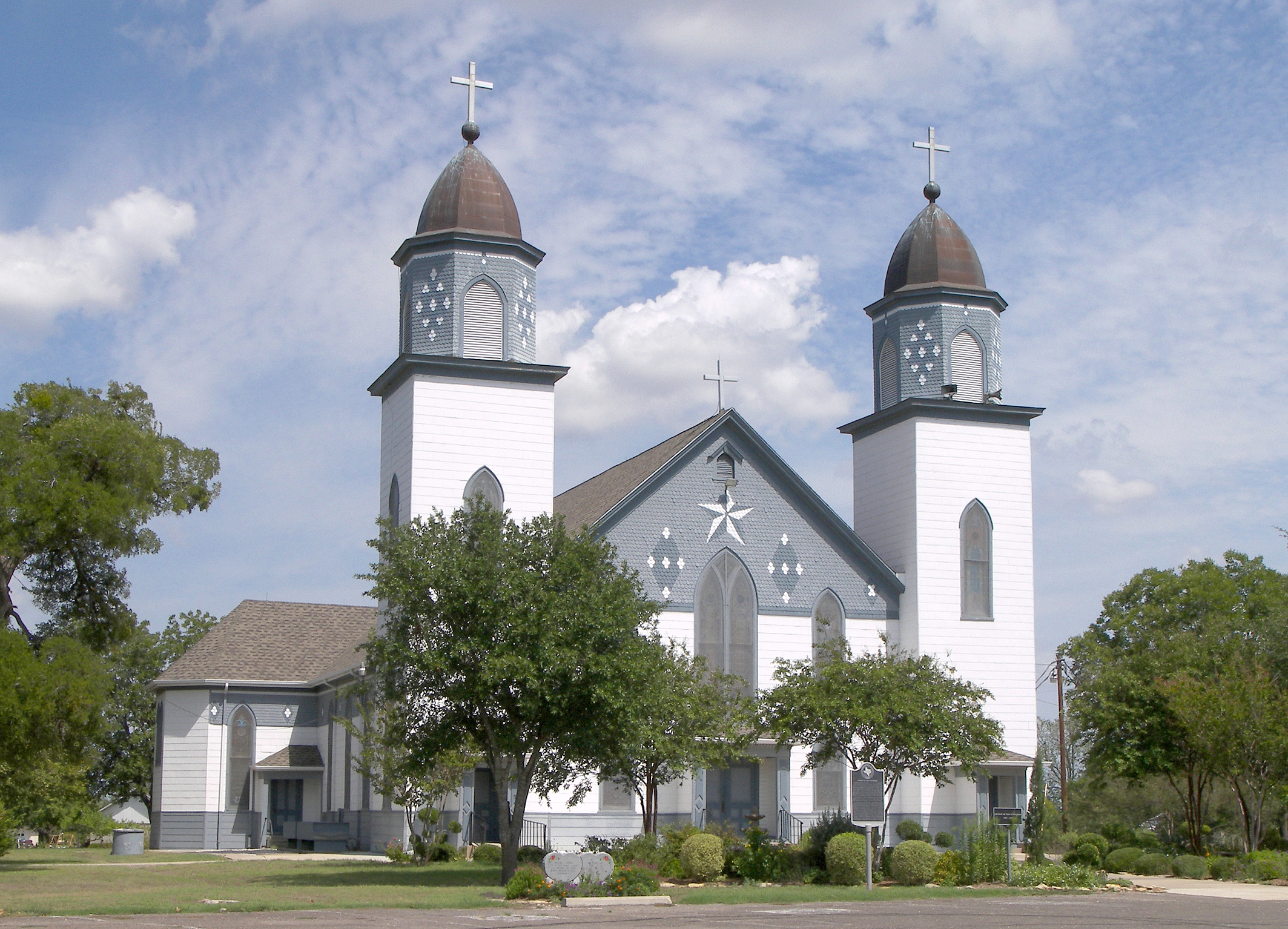
- Church of the Visitation

- Location within Texas Location within the United States
- Location: Roughly bounded by Co. Rt. 383, Pond Cr., Co. Rts. 377, 368, 372, 373, and the Falls Co. western boundary line, Westphalia, Texas
- Coordinates: 31.122707°N 97.114536°W
- Built: 1895
- Part of: Westphalia Rural Historic District (ID96000524)
- Added to NRHP: May 15, 1996

The Church of the Visitation, in Westphalia, Texas, was once the largest wooden structure west of the Mississippi River. This Catholic church in the Roman Catholic Diocese of Austin, completed in 1895, has twin towers which can be seen for miles. A school was constructed in 1896 and operated as a parochial school until 1935.

The church received official recognition with the erection of an official Texas Historical Marker on December 31, 1978. On May 15, 1996, the community was recognized as the Westphalia Rural Historic District. The district is now listed in the National Register of Historic Places.

On July 29, 2019, the building caught fire and burned to the ground.
