= Westphalia Independent School District =

School district in Texas

Westphalia Independent School District is a public school district based in the unincorporated community of Westphalia, Texas (USA).

The district has one school that serves students in grades kindergarten through eight. The school mascot is the Bluejay.

In 2009, the school district was rated "exemplary" by the Texas Education Agency.

== Schools ==
Westphalia Elementary School (Grades K-5) Westphalia Middle School (Grades 6-8)

== Athletics ==
Westphalia Middle School takes part in a variety of sports:

=== Boys ===
Football, Cross country running, Basketball, and Track

=== Girls ===
Volleyball, Cheerleading, Cross Country, Basketball, and Track.
