= Welda Township, Kansas =

Welda Township
- Township
- Location in Anderson County
- Coordinates: 38°09′45″N 095°19′31″W
- Country: United States
- State: Kansas
- County: Anderson

Area
  - Total: 44.8 sq mi (116.0 km^{2})
  - Land: 44.4 sq mi (115.1 km^{2})
  - Water: 0.39 sq mi (1.0 km^{2}) 0.83%
- Elevation: 1,079 ft (329 m)

Population (2010)
  - Total: 290
  - Density: 6.5/sq mi (2.5/km^{2})
- GNIS feature ID: 0477893

Welda Township is a township in Anderson County, Kansas, United States. As of the 2010 census, its population was 290.

== Geography ==
Welda Township covers an area of 44.8 square miles (116.0 km^{2}) and contains no incorporated settlements and one census-designated place, Welda. According to the USGS, it contains two cemeteries: Wardell and Welda.
