= National Register of Historic Places listings in Falls County, Texas =

Location of Falls County in Texas

This is a list of the National Register of Historic Places listings in Falls County, Texas.

This is intended to be a complete list of properties and districts listed on the National Register of Historic Places in Falls County, Texas. There are one district and one individual property listed on the National Register in the county. The individually listed property is also a State Antiquities Landmark and a Recorded Texas Historic Landmark while the district contains an additional Recorded Texas Historic Landmark.

This National Park Service list is complete through NPS recent listings posted March 21, 2025.

== Current listings ==
The locations of National Register properties and districts may be seen in a mapping service provided.

	Name on the Register	Image	Date listed	Location	City or town	Description
1	Falls County Courthouse	Falls County Courthouse	December 13, 2000 (#00001532)	1 Courthouse Sq; 31°18′25″N 96°53′55″W	Marlin	State Antiquities Landmark, Recorded Texas Historic Landmark
2	Westphalia Rural Historic District	Westphalia Rural Historic District	May 15, 1996 (#96000524)	Roughly bounded by Co. Rt. 383, Pond Cr., Co. Rts. 377, 368, 372, 373, and the Falls Co. western boundary line 31°07′00″N 97°07′00″W	Westphalia	Includes Recorded Texas Historic Landmark

== See also ==
- National Register of Historic Places listings in Texas
- Recorded Texas Historic Landmarks in Falls County
