= Garnett USD 365 =

Public school district in Garnett, Kansas

Address
- 305 N Oak St. Garnett, Kansas, 66032; United States

District information
- Type: Public
- Grades: K to 12
- Schools: 5

Other information
- Website: usd365.org

Garnett USD 365 is a public unified school district headquartered in Garnett, Kansas, United States. The district includes the communities of Garnett, Greeley, Westphalia, Welda, and nearby rural areas.

== History ==
In 1971 voters in USD 365 defeated a $1.7 million bond issue to build a new high school on a 1,447 no to a 740 yes count.

In 2008, Gordon Myers, the USD 365 superintendent, retired. Donald Blome, who had been the superintendent of the Burlingame USD 454 school district, was hired as the new superintendent that year.

== Schools ==
The school district operates the following schools:

- Anderson County High School in Garnett
- Garnett Elementary School in Garnett
- Greeley Elementary School in Greeley
- Westphalia Elementary School in Westphalia

== See also ==
- Kansas State Department of Education
- Kansas State High School Activities Association
- List of high schools in Kansas
- List of unified school districts in Kansas
