= Welda, Kansas =

Unincorporated community in Anderson County, Kansas

- CDP
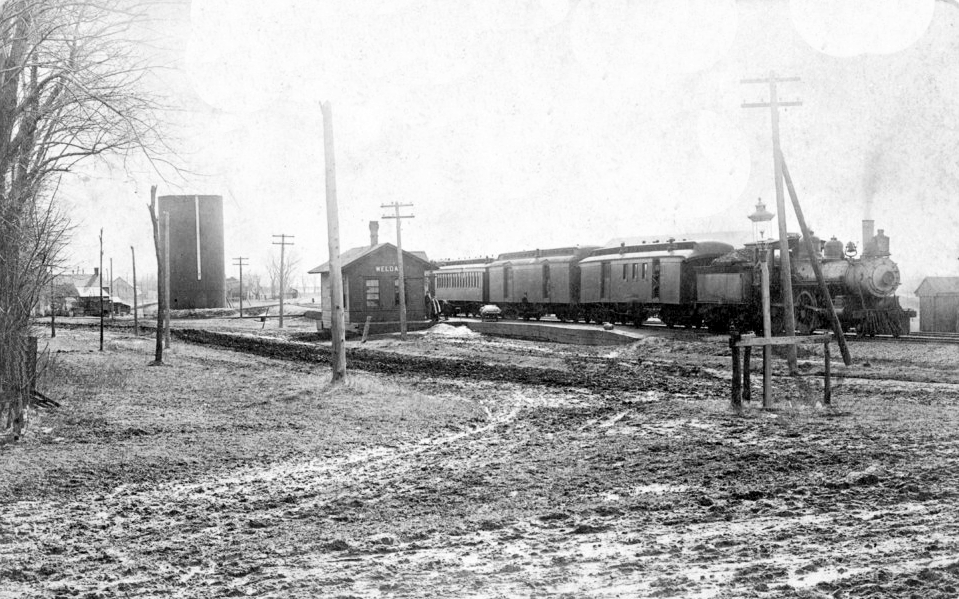
- Atchison, Topeka and Santa Fe Railway depot, circa 1890

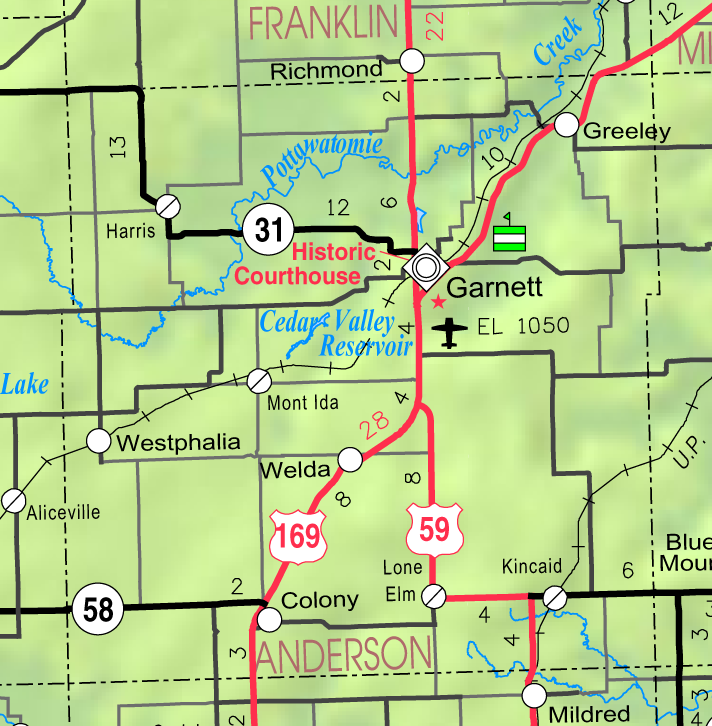
- KDOT map of Anderson County (legend)

- Location within Kansas Location within the United States
- Coordinates: 38°10′29″N 95°17′29″W
- Country: United States
- State: Kansas
- County: Anderson
- Township: Welda
- Platted: 1873
- Named for: Welda, Germany

Area
  - Total: 0.93 sq mi (2.42 km^{2})
  - Land: 0.93 sq mi (2.40 km^{2})
  - Water: 0.0077 sq mi (0.02 km^{2})
- Elevation: 1,086 ft (331 m)

Population (2020)
  - Total: 149
  - Density: 161/sq mi (62.1/km^{2})
- Time zone: UTC-6 (CST)
  - Summer (DST): UTC-5 (CDT)
- ZIP Code: 66091
- Area code: 785
- FIPS code: 20-76425
- GNIS ID: 2629185

Welda is a census-designated place (CDP) in Welda Township, Anderson County, Kansas, United States. As of the 2020 census, the population was 149.

== History ==
Welda was platted in 1873, soon after the railroad was extended to that point in 1870. Its post office was established in 1874, probably named for Welda in Germany.

The railroad tracks in Welda have since been converted to a rail trail. The trail is part of the Prairie Spirit Trail State Park.

== Geography ==
According to the United States Census Bureau, the CDP has a total area of 0.93 square miles (2.4 km^{2}), of which 0.0077 square miles (0.02 km^{2}), or 0.79%, is water.

== Demographics ==
Historical population
Census	Pop.	Note	%±
2020	149		—
U.S. Decennial Census

== Education ==
The community is served by Garnett USD 365 public school district, and operates Mont Ida Elementary School in Welda and Anderson County Junior-Senior High School in Garnett.

Welda schools were closed through school unification. The Welda High School mascot was Welda Pirates.
