= Langenhorn, Hamburg =

Langenhorn
- Quarter of Hamburg
- Coat of arms

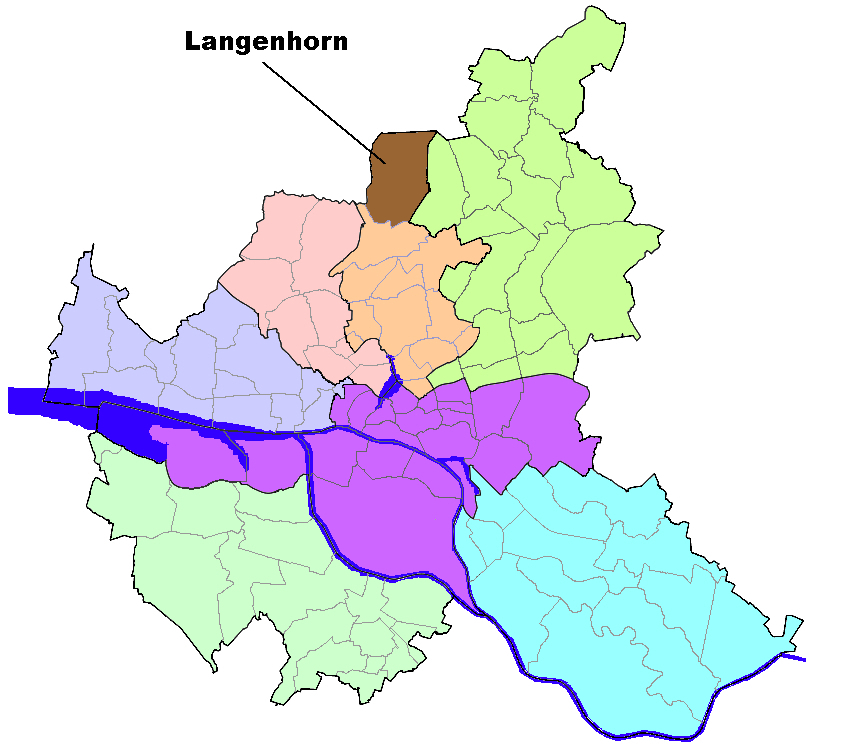
- Location of Langenhorn in Hamburg
- Interactive map of Langenhorn
- Location within Germany Location within Hamburg
- Coordinates: 53°39′0″N 10°0′0″E
- Country: Germany
- State: Hamburg
- City: Hamburg
- Borough: Hamburg-Nord

Area
  - Total: 13.8 km^{2} (5.3 sq mi)

Population (2024-12-31)
  - Total: 48,901
  - Density: 3,540/km^{2} (9,180/sq mi)
- Time zone: UTC+01:00 (CET)
  - Summer (DST): UTC+02:00 (CEST)
- Dialling codes: 040
- Vehicle registration: HH

Langenhorn (German pronunciation: [ˈlaŋənhɔʁn]) is a quarter in the borough Hamburg-Nord of Hamburg, Germany. In 2020 the population was 46,272.

== History ==
On January 25, 1332, Langenhorn was sold to Hamburg by the Count of Holstein. Since then, Langenhorn has been a part of Hamburg.

A subcamp to the Neuengamme concentration camp existed in Langenhorn from September 12, 1944, until April 4, 1945.

== Geography ==
In 2006, according to the statistical office of Hamburg and Schleswig-Holstein, the quarter Langenhorn has a total area of 13.8 km^{2}. To the north and the west is the state Schleswig-Holstein. In the east is the quarter Hummelsbüttel of the Wandsbek borough and in the south is the quarter Fuhlsbüttel.

== Demographics ==
In 2006, the population of the Langenhorn quarter was 40,425. The population density was 2,939 inhabitants per square kilometre (7,612/sq mi). 18.1% were children under the age of 18, and 20.1% were 65 years of age or older. 11,8% were immigrants. 1,975 people were registered as unemployed. In 1999, there were 20,546 households, and 43.8% of all households were made up of individuals.

== Education ==
There are 6 elementary schools and 5 secondary schools in the Langenhorn quarter.

== Infrastructure ==
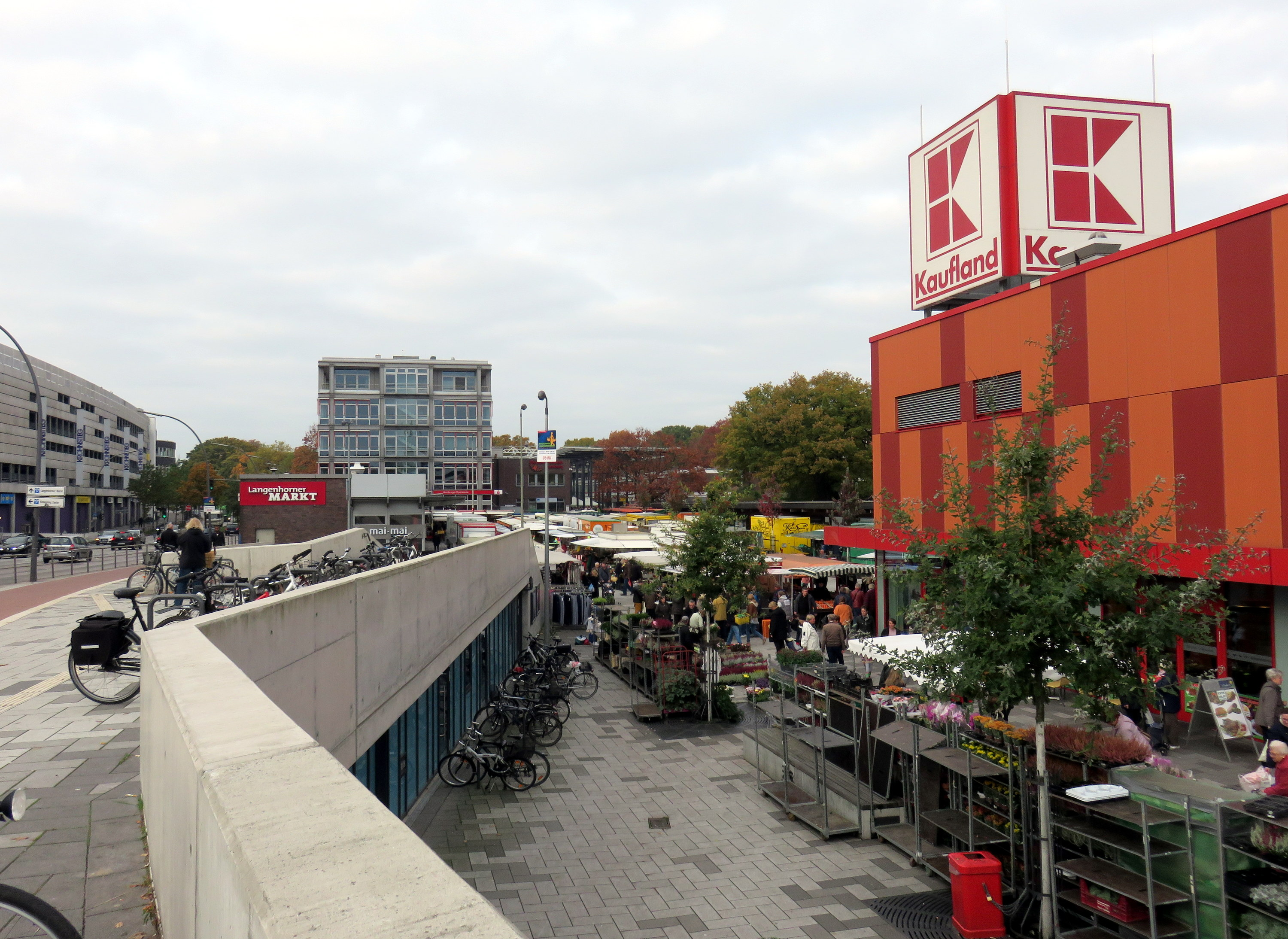
Market place in the center of Langenhorn.

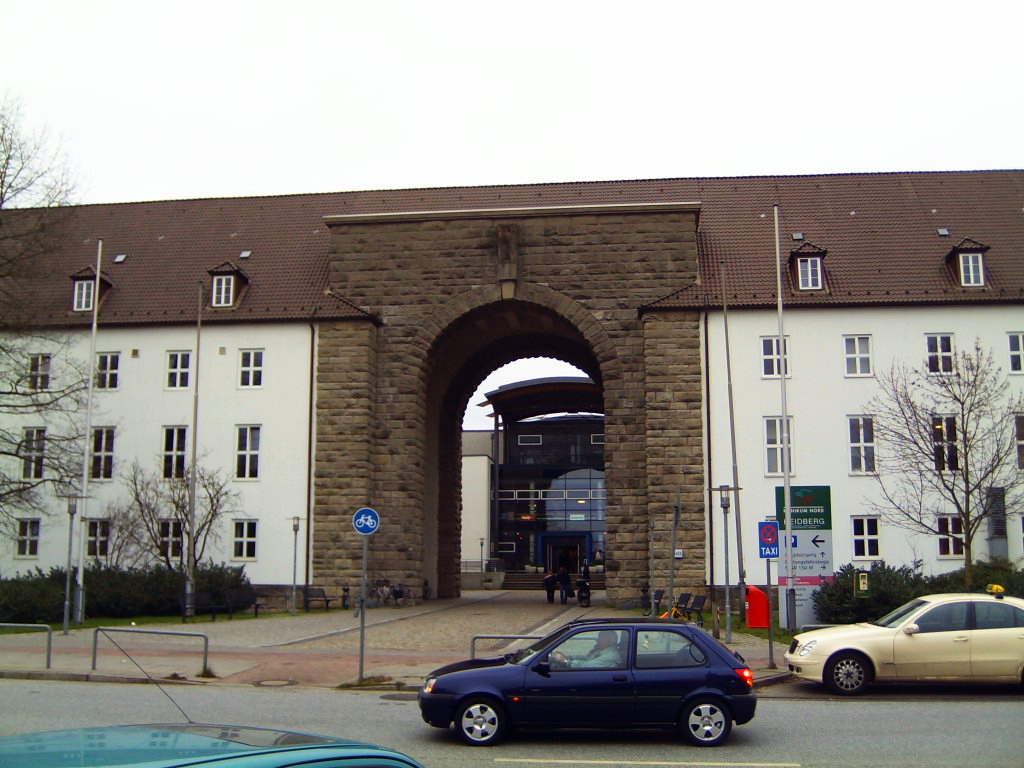
Main entrance of the hospital branch Heidberg

Established in 1832, the Honorary Consulate of the Kingdom of Belgium is located in the street Langenhorner Markt 9.

=== Health systems ===
The Alskelpios Klinik Nord has a total of 1,331 beds and 143 day care places in 13 departments. It is divided into the branches Ochsenzoll and Heidberg, both formerly independent public hospitals. Both are general hospitals and teaching hospitals to the University of Hamburg and have the capacity to dispatch emergency medical services. The branch Ochsenzoll, Langenhorner Chaussee 560, is specialized in psychiatric problems and geriatric diseases. There are 178 beds in forensic psychiatry for hospital treatment. The branch Heidberg, Tangstedter Landstr. 400, parts located in a former SS barracks, provides the ophthalmology, ear, nose and throat and the gynaecology and the maternity clinic departments.

There were 22 day-care centers for children, 57 physicians in private practice and 11 pharmacies.

=== Transportation ===
Langenhorn is served by the Hamburg U-Bahn rapid transit system with several stations. According to the Department of Motor Vehicles (Kraftfahrt-Bundesamt), 16,274 private cars were registered (403 cars/1000 people) in the quarter Langenhorn .

== Notable persons ==
- Helmut Schmidt, former Chancellor of Germany, lived in Langenhorn.
- Jens Westphalen, Filmmaker, Director and DOP was born in Langenhorn
