= Anderson County High School (Kansas) =

Coordinates: 38°17′16.5″N 95°15′36.5″W

Anderson County Jr/Sr High School

Location
- 1100 West Highway 31; Garnett, Kansas 66032; United States

Information
- School type: Public high school
- School district: Garnett USD 365
- Staff: 33.40 (FTE)
- Grades: 7–12
- Enrollment: 287 (2025-2026)
- Student to teacher ratio: 12.96
- Campus: Rural
- Colors: Red and white
- Mascot: Bulldog
- Website: ac.usd365.org

Anderson County Jr/Sr High School is a public secondary school in Garnett, Kansas, United States. It serves students in grades 7–12 and the only high school operated by the Garnett USD 365 school district. The school colors are red and white and the school mascot is the Bulldog. The district serves residents of Anderson County, including Garnett, Greeley, Welda, and Westphalia.

== Extracurricular activities ==
=== Athletics ===
The extracurricular activities offered at Anderson County Jr/Sr High School are relatively small and limited due to the school's small size. The Bulldogs are classified as a 3A school, the fourth-largest classification in Kansas according to the Kansas State High School Activities Association. Throughout its history, Anderson County has won two state championships, both in golf (1999, 2002).

=== State championships ===
State Championships
Season	Sport	Number of Championships	Year
Spring	Golf, boys	2	1999, 2002
Total		2	

== See also ==
- List of high schools in Kansas
- List of unified school districts in Kansas
