= 36th Fighter Squadron =

United States Air Force combat squadron

36th Fighter Squadron

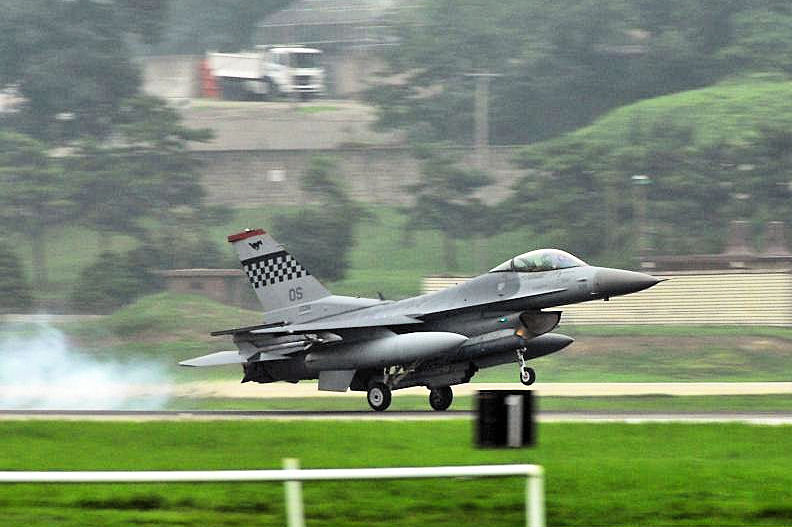
- Squadron F-16C landing at Osan AB in 2008
- Active: 1917–1919; 1930–present
- Country: United States
- Branch: United States Air Force
- Type: Fighter
- Part of: Pacific Air Forces; 7th Air Force; 51st Fighter Wing; 51st Operations Group
- Garrison/HQ: Osan Air Base, Korea
- Nickname: The Flying Fiends
- Motto: Check Six! Harrumph!
- Mascot: Tojo
- Anniversaries: The Fiend Centennial (28 Sep – 1 October 2017 Osan AB, ROK)
- Engagements: World War I World War II; Korean War; Vietnam War
- Decorations: Distinguished Unit Citation; Presidential Unit Citation; Air Force Outstanding Unit Award; Philippine Presidential Unit Citation; Republic of Korea Presidential Unit Citation; Republic of Vietnam Gallantry Cross with Palm

Commanders
- Current commander: Lt Col Kirk Smith
- Notable commanders: Quentin Roosevelt; Ennis Whitehead; Major General Scott D. West

Insignia
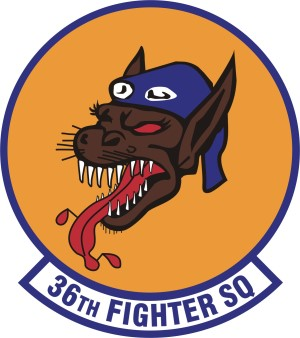
- 36th Fighter Squadron emblem (Note: Approved 25 September 2007.)

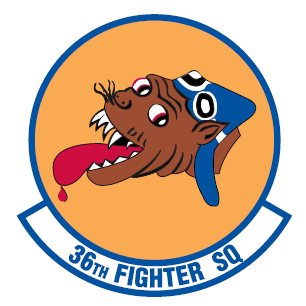
- 36th Tactical Fighter Squadron emblem (Note: Reinstated and modified 6 August 1968.)

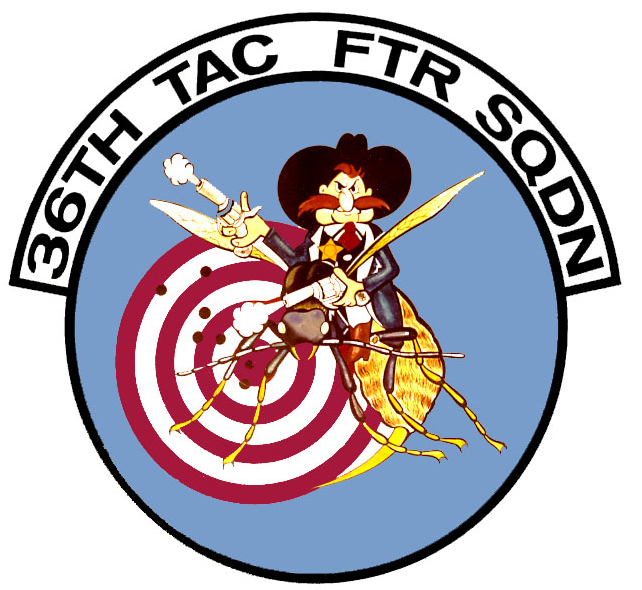
- 36 Tactical Fighter Squadron emblem (Note: Approved 8 December 1967.)

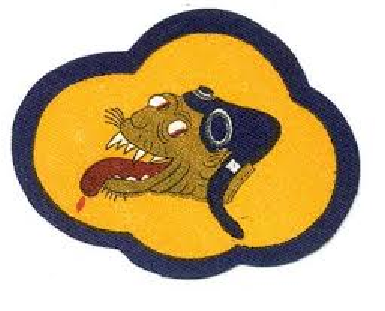
- 36th Pursuit Squadron emblem (Note: Approved 13 January 1931.)

The 36th Fighter Squadron is part of the US Air Force's 51st Operations Group at Osan Air Base, South Korea. It operates the General Dynamics F-16 Fighting Falcon aircraft conducting air superiority missions. The squadron was first activated in 1917 as the 36th Aero Squadron and served in France during World War I, although the war ended before the unit saw combat. It has been continuously active since 1930 as a fighter squadron.

The squadron mission is to conduct suppression of enemy air defenses (SEAD), air interdiction, close air support, and counter-air missions both day and night. It participates in the defense of South Korea and operates further afield.

== History ==
During its 101-year history, the 36th Fighter Squadron has flown 21 different types of aircraft, received 22 unit citations and accumulated 24 service and campaign streamers.

=== World War I ===
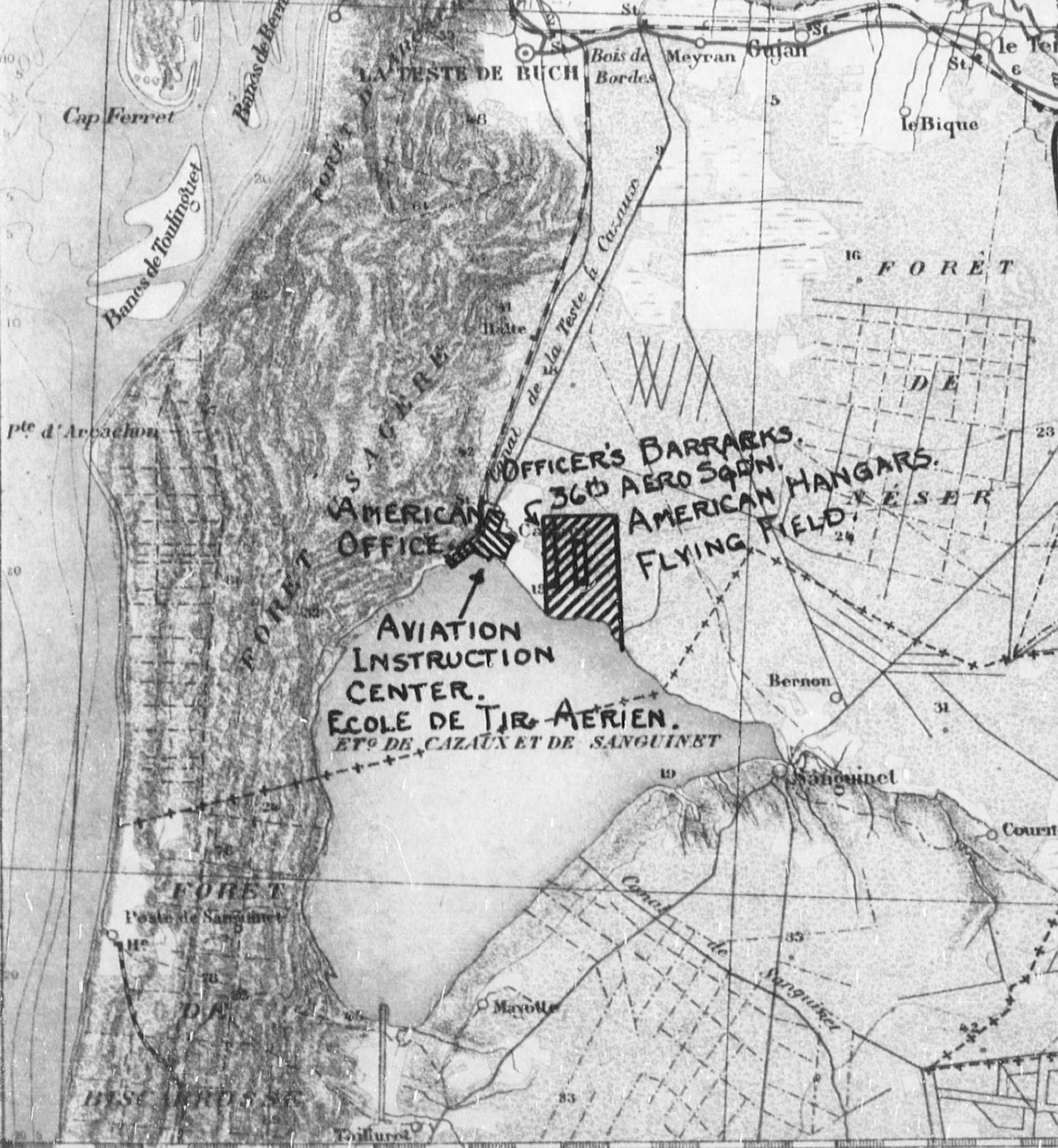
Map of Cazaux AIC showing 36th Aero Squadron location

The 36th Aero Squadron came into existence at Kelly Field, Texas in June 1917, shortly after the United States entered World War I. Later that year, First Lieutenant Quentin Roosevelt, the son of President Theodore Roosevelt, briefly commanded the squadron. After a brief training period, the squadron moved overseas on the RMS Baltic. Landing in France in September 1917, the squadron shortly stopped at the Étampes aerodrome before settling at the 3rd Aviation Instruction Center on Issoudun Aerodrome, where it helped building the new center before being declared operational some time at the end of year. On 21 February 1918, the 36th Aero Sqn (Repair) arrived at the Cazaux aerodrome, home of the French Aerial Gunnery School, where it helped maintaining the aircraft of the American detachment. On 5 November, it moved to the newly created American Aerial Gunnery School, in St. Jean de Monts, France. On 16 February 1919, the squadron reached the harbor of St. Nazaire, France, from where it sailed back to the United States on 14 March, on the USS Manchuria and was demobilized in the spring of 1919 at Garden City, New York

=== Interwar period ===
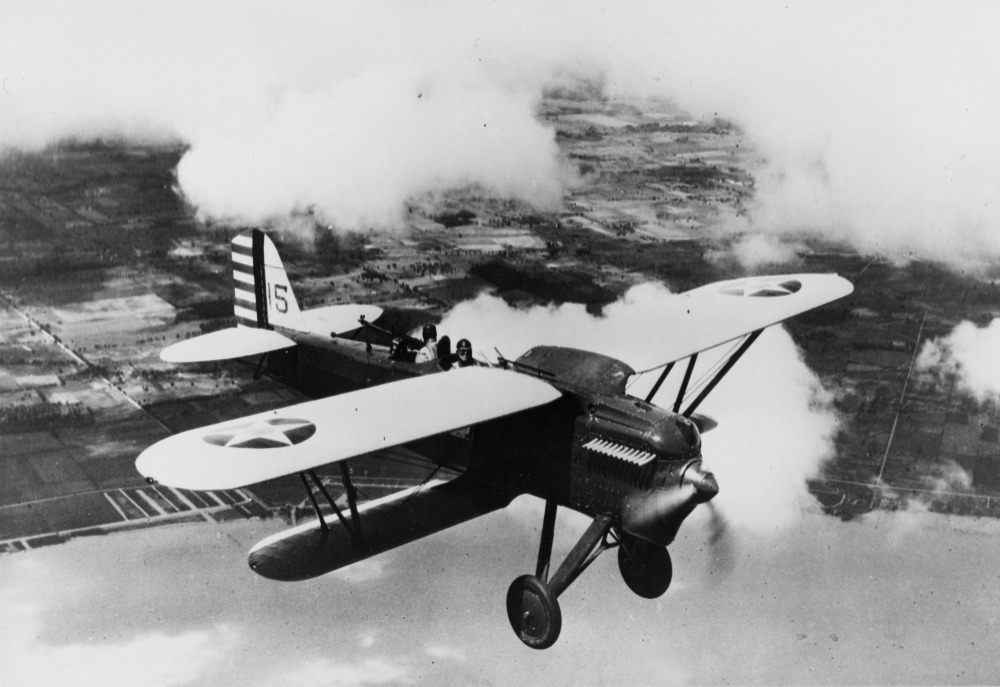
Berliner Joyce P-16

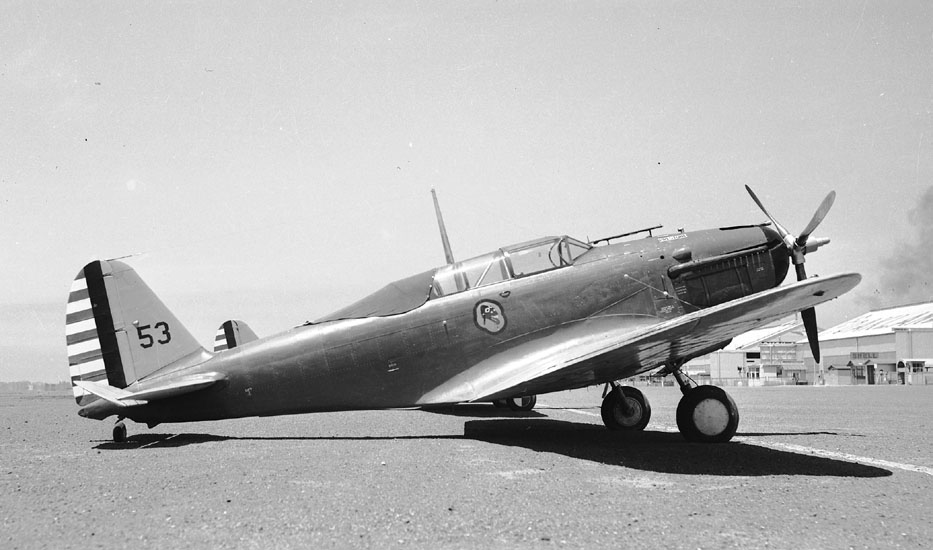
Squadron Consolidated P-30

The squadron was reconstituted in 1923 as the 36th Pursuit Squadron. Although inactive, it was originally allotted to the Sixth Corps Area. In 1929 the squadron was designated as a "Regular Army Inactive" unit. Although remaining inactive as a regular unit, officers of the Organized Reserves were assigned to the unit and performed summer training with the squadron at Kelly Field for the next few years.

In October 1930 the squadron was once again activated at Selfridge Field, Michigan, (Note: The squadron's reservists were reassigned to other units. Clay, p. 1401.) where it was attached to the 1st Pursuit Group and equipped with various models of the Curtiss Hawk series of single engine biplane pursuit aircraft. By 1932, the squadron's primary aircraft became the Boeing P-12, although the squadron continued to fly the P-6 model of the Hawk. As part of its mission to develop pursuit tactics, the squadron continued to fly a variety of other aircraft, notably including the Berliner-Joyce P-16 and Consolidated P-30 two-seat fighters. Training of fighter pilots and testing of tactics continued after 1932 when the squadron moved to Langley Field, Virginia, where it was assigned to the 8th Pursuit Group.

In 1934, following a Congressional investigation of how air mail contracts had been awarded by the United States Postal Service, President Franklin D. Roosevelt cancelled all existing air mail contracts and assigned the duty of flying the mail to the Air Corps. The squadron began flying its P-12s on air mail routes, but they proved unsuitable for the work, lacking instruments to fly at night or in adverse weather. Moreover, they could only carry about 50 lbs of mail, and with the mail load, the planes were tail heavy and difficult to fly. The P-12s were withdrawn from the project within a week, although the larger observation aircraft continued to fly mail until May, when new air mail contracts were awarded.

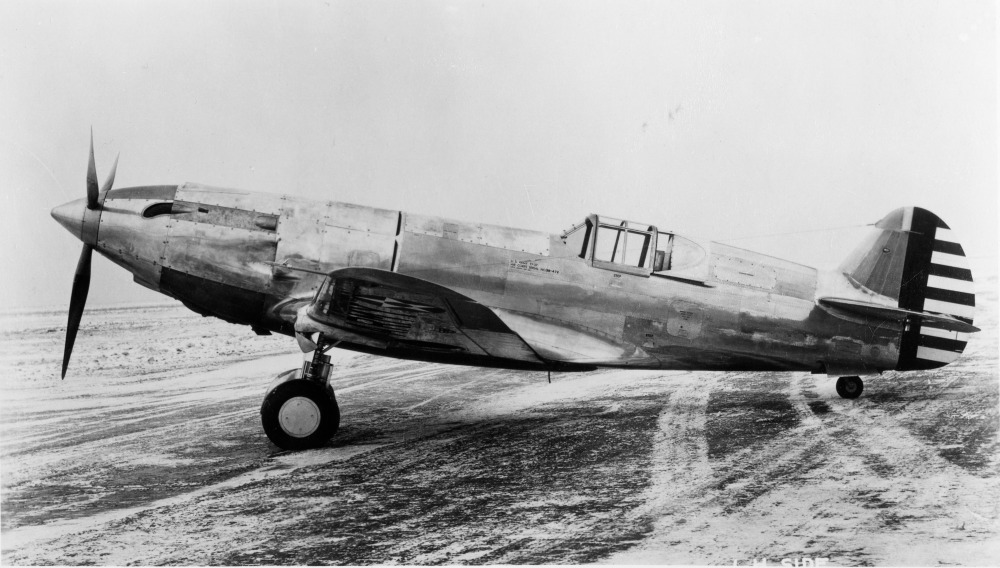
Curtiss YP-37

The P-30, along with the arrival of Curtiss YP-37s in 1938 marked a significant change in the squadron's equipment, the transition from fabric-covered biplanes to all metal monoplanes. By 1939, the squadron was flying Curtiss P-36 Hawks, which were quickly replaced by the more powerful Curtiss P-40 Warhawks. As the Air Corps expanded in 1940, the squadron moved to Mitchel Field, New York, and was located there when the attack on Pearl Harbor occurred in December 1941.

=== World War II ===
During World War II, the squadron flew P-40 Warhawk, P-39 Airacobra, P-47 Thunderbolt, and P-38 Lightning fighters in a number of Pacific Theater campaigns. These included the defense of New Guinea and the battle for the Philippines. They moved to Fukuoka, Japan at the end of the war.

=== Korean War ===
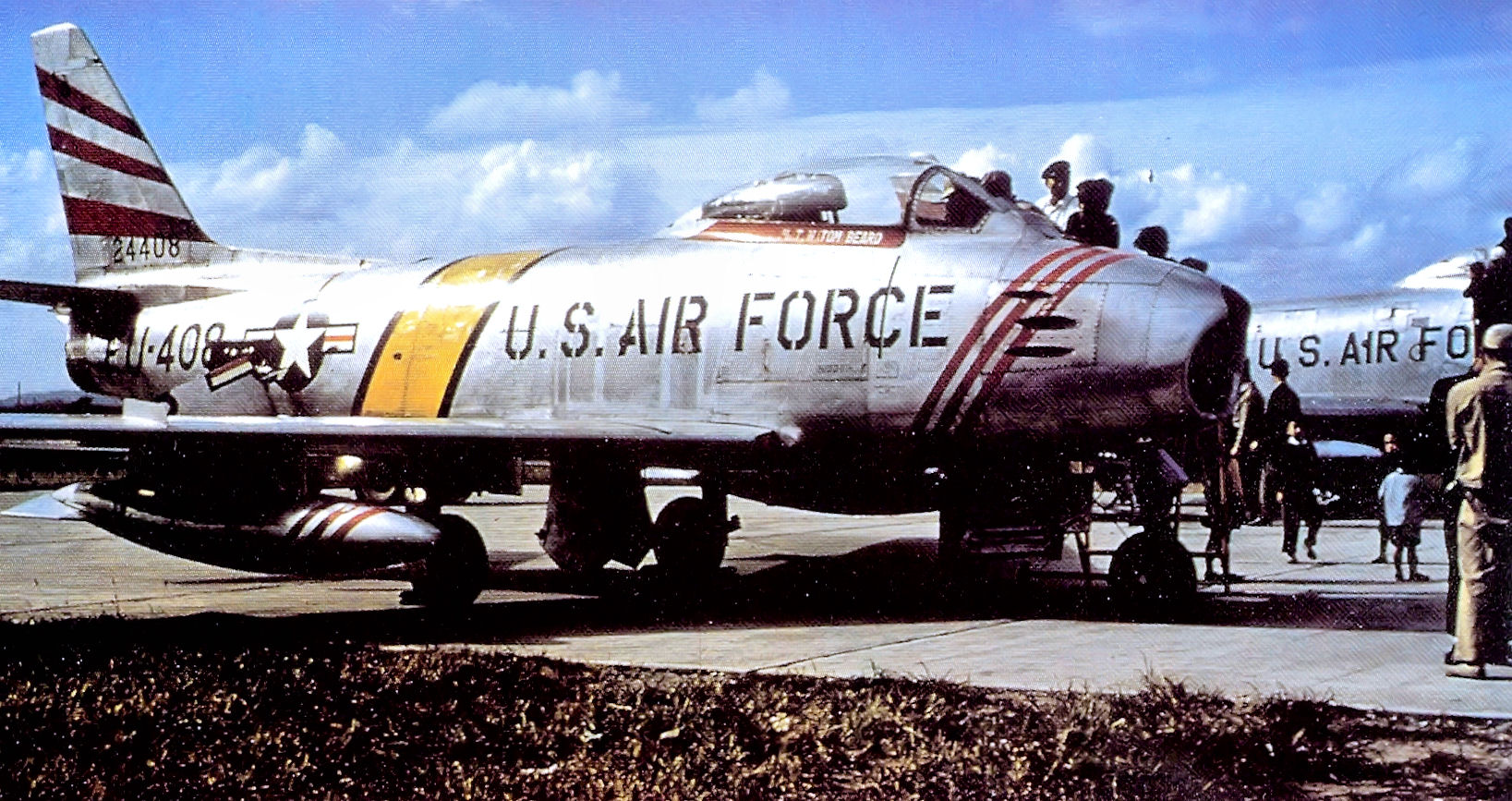
F-86F-30-NA Sabre 52-4408 Itazuke Air Base, Japan. 1954

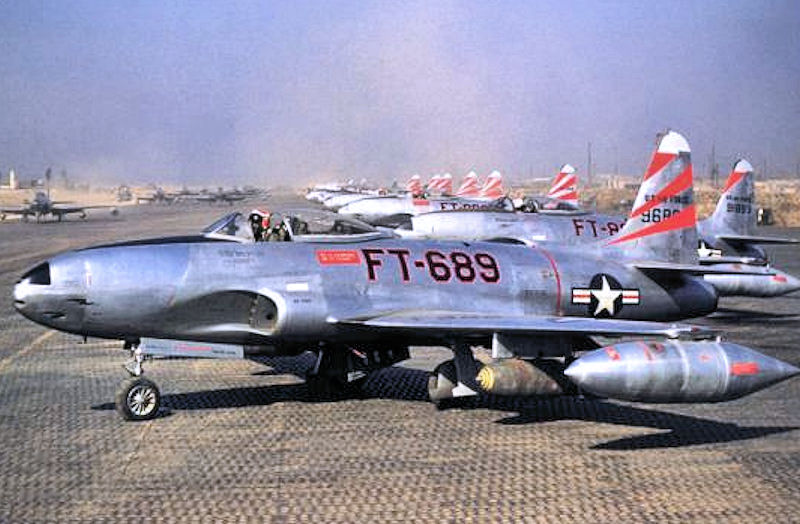
Lockheed F-80C-10-LO Shooting Star 49-689, Suwon Air Base, South Korea, 1950

When the communist forces attacked the Republic of Korea in June 1950, the 36th found itself in the fight from the beginning of the conflict. Flying F-80 Shooting Stars, the squadron attacked advancing North Korean tanks, trucks, artillery, and troops. The unit later converted back to the piston-engined F-51 Mustang, considered more suitable for operations in Korea. The 36th ended the war equipped with F-86 Sabres, flying bombing and strafing missions against enemy air fields. The 36th returned to Japan after the Korean War, operating out of Itazuke Air Base for the next 10 years.

=== Vietnam War ===
During the Vietnam War, the 36th flew combat missions into Southeast Asia from Korat Royal Thai Air Force Base. 36th pilots flew F-105 Thunderchiefs, escorting rescue aircraft and suppressing anti-aircraft fire. The squadron was re-equipped with F-4 Phantom II fighters in December 1967 and stationed at Yokota Air Base, Japan, with regular deployments to Kunsan Air Base beginning in March 1971. The 36th moved to Kunsan in May 1971, establishing a forward operating location at Osan Air Base. The squadron permanently moved to Osan and was assigned to the 51st Composite Wing (Tactical) in September 1974.

=== Post Cold War ===
The 36th ushered in the era of the "Fighting Falcon" on 10 August 1988, when squadron commander Lieutenant Colonel Al Spitzer landed the first F-16 Fighting Falcon at Osan. The squadron's combat capabilities were transformed in 1990 when the squadron converted to the Block 40 Low Altitude Navigational and Targeting Infrared for Night (LANTIRN) F-16C/D. The addition of LANTIRN gave the Fiends the current ability to fly at low levels and deliver precision guided munitions during nighttime conditions. Upgrades to the Block 40 in recent years have included GBU-31 JDAM capability for all weather precision engagement. The 36th FS, more recently, have begun training with the AIM-9X Sidewinder and the AN/AAQ-33 Sniper XR Advanced Targeting Pod. Additionally, in the Spring of 2012 the Fiends acquired the AN/ASQ-213 HARM Targeting System, becoming the first Block 40 SEAD squadron in the United States Air Force.

== Lineage ==
- Organized as the 36th Aero Squadron on 12 June 1917
- Redesignated 36th Aero Squadron (Construction) c. 1918

Demobilized on 7 April 1919

- Reconstituted and redesignated 36th Pursuit Squadron on 24 March 1923

Activated on 2 October 1930
Redesignated 36th Pursuit Squadron (Fighter) on 6 December 1939
Redesignated 36th Pursuit Squadron (Interceptor) on 12 March 1941
Redesignated 36th Fighter Squadron on 15 May 1942
Redesignated 36th Fighter Squadron, Two Engine on 19 February 1944
Redesignated 36th Fighter Squadron, Single Engine on 1 April 1946
Redesignated 36th Fighter Squadron, Jet on 1 January 1950
Redesignated 36th Fighter-Bomber Squadron on 20 January 1950
Redesignated 36th Tactical Fighter Squadron on 1 July 1958
Redesignated 36th Fighter Squadron on 7 February 1992

=== Assignments ===
- Unknown, 12 June – c. 24 September 1917
- Third Aviation Instruction Center, c. 24 September 1917
- École de Tirage Aérienne, c. 21 February 1918
- Aerial Gunnery School, c. 5 November 1918 – c. 16 February 1919
- Unknown, – 7 February April 1919
- 2d Bombardment Wing, 2 October 1930 (attached to 1st Pursuit Group)
- 8th Pursuit Group, 1 April 1931 (attached to 1st Pursuit Group)
- 18th Pursuit Group, 30 June 1931 (attached to 1st Pursuit Group)
- 8th Pursuit Group (later 8th Fighter Group, 8th Fighter-Bomber Group), 15 June 1932 (attached to 8th Fighter-Bomber Wing after 1 February 1957)
- 8th Fighter-Bomber Wing (later 8th Tactical Fighter Wing), 1 October 1957 (attached to 41st Air Division after 13 May 1964) (Note: Robertson Says 4th Air Division. However, in May 1964, the 4th Air Division was a Strategic Air Command bomber division at Barksdale Air Force Base. The 41st Air Division was in Japan.)
- 41st Air Division, 18 June 1964 (attached to 2d Air Division, 9 August – 5 October 1964, 6 March – 4 May 1965)
- 6441st Tactical Fighter Wing, 1 April 1965 (attached to 2d Air Division, 26 August – 28 October 1965)
- 41st Air Division, 15 November 1966
- 347th Tactical Fighter Wing, 15 January 1968
- 3d Tactical Fighter Wing, 15 May 1971
- 8th Tactical Fighter Wing, 16 September 1974
- 51st Composite Wing (later 51st Tactical Fighter Wing), 30 September 1974
- 51st Fighter Group (later 51st Operations Group), 1 October 1990 – present

=== Stations ===
- Camp Kelly (later Kelly Field), Texas, 12 June – 11 August 1917
- Étampes, France, 19 September 1917
- Issoudun, France, 24 September 1917
- Cazaux, France, 21 February 1918
- Saint-Jean-de-Monts, France, 5 November 1918
- Saint-Nazaire, France, 16 February – 14 March 1919
- Garden City, New York, 25 March – 7 April 1919
- Selfridge Field, Michigan, 2 October 1930
- Langley Field, Virginia, 13 June 1932
- Mitchel Field, New York, 15 November 1940 – 26 January 1942
- Brisbane, Australia, 6 March 1942
- Lowood, Australia, 13 March 1942
- Townsville, Queensland, Australia, 4 April 1942
- Port Moresby, New Guinea, 26 April 1942
- Townsville, Australia, 30 June 1942
- Milne Bay, New Guinea, 18 September 1942
- Mareeba, Australia, 22 February 1943
- Port Moresby, New Guinea, 22 May 1943
- Nadzab, New Guinea, 22 December 1943
- Finschhafen, New Guinea, 9 January 1944
- Nadzab, New Guinea, 14 March 1944
- Owi, Schouten Islands, 17 June 1944
- Morotai, Philippines, 19 September 1944
- Dulag Airfield, Leyte, Philippines, 5 November 1944 (operated from Morotai until 30 November 1944)
- San Jose, Occidental Mindoro, Philippines, 20 December 1944
- Ie Shima Airfield, Okinawa, 6 August 1945
- Fukuoka, Japan, 24 November 1945
- Ashiya Air Base, Japan, 22 May 1946
- Itazuke Air Base, Japan, 6 September 1946
- Ashiya Air Base, Japan, Japan, 14 April 1947
- Itazuke Air Base, Japan, 25 March 1949
- Tsuiki Air Base, Japan, 11 August 1950
- Suwon Air Base, South Korea, 5 October 1950
- Kimpo Air Base, South Korea, 29 October 1950
- Pyongyang Air Base, North Korea, 25 November 1950
- Seoul Air Base, South Korea, 3 December 1950
- Itazuke Air Base, Japan, 10 December 1950
- Kimpo Air Base, South Korea, 25 June 1951
- Suwon Air Base, South Korea, c. 26 August 1951
- Itazuke Air Base, Japan, 19 October 1954
- Yokota Air Base, Japan, 13 May 1964

Deployed to Korat Royal Thai Air Force Base, Thailand, 9 August – 5 October 1964; Takhli Royal Thai Air Force Base, Thailand, 6 March – 4 May, 26 August – 28 October 1965; Osan Air Base, South Korea, 1 October – 24 November 1968, 18 February – 24 March 1969, 27 May – 1 July 1969, 9 September – 18 October 1969, 27 December 1969 – 31 January 1970, 10 April – 9 May 1970, 20 June – 11 July 1970, 4 September – 2 October 1970, 27 November – 26 December 1970

- Kunsan Air Base, South Korea, 15 May 1971
- Osan Air Base, South Korea, 13 November 1971 – present

=== Aircraft ===
- Douglas O-2 (1930–1932)
- Curtiss P-1 Hawk (1930–1932)
- Curtiss P-6 Hawk (1930–1932, 1932–1935, 1936–1937)
- Berliner-Joyce P-16 (1932–1935)
- Boeing P-12 (1932–1936)
- Fokker O-27 (1932–1935)
- Consolidated P-30 (PB-2) (1937–1939)
- Curtiss P-36 Hawk (1939–1940)
- Curtiss YP-37 (1938–1940)
- Northrop A-17 Nomad (1938–1940)
- Curtiss P-40 Warhawk (1940–1941)
- Bell P-39 Airacobra (1941–1943)
- Bell P-400 Airacobra (1942–1943)
- Republic P-47 Thunderbolt (1943–1944)
- Lockheed P-38 Lightning (1944–1946)
- North American P-51 Mustang (1946–1950)
- Lockheed F-80 Shooting Star (1949–1953)
- North American F-86 Sabre (1953–1957)
- North American F-100 Super Sabre (1957–1963)
- Republic F-105 Thunderchief (1963–1966)
- McDonnell F-4 Phantom II (1967–1989)
- General Dynamics F-16 Fighting Falcon (1988 – present)

== See also ==
- List of American aero squadrons
