= Westphalia Waltz =

- Waltz by Cotton Collins
- Key: G major
- Composed: 1940s
- Published: 1947

The Westphalia Waltz is an historic Texas waltz by Cotton Collins, a fiddler with the Lone Star Playboys, named after the town of Westphalia, Texas.

The Westphalia Waltz melody is derived from a well known Polish tune that goes by several names, among them "Pytala Sie Pani" and "Wszystkie Rybki."

The waltz was later popularized by Hank Thompson on a 1955 Capitol Records recording.
