= German Club 1954 =

The German Club 1954 (in German: Deutscher Klub 1954) was a neutralist political group in the Federal Republic of Germany; it acted from 1954 to 1960, when it merged with the German Peace Union.

The German Club was founded in 1954 by Karl von Westphalen and other former CDU members, who opposed Konrad Adenauer's policies of attachment to the West. The German Club 1954 sought an understanding between the West and the Soviet bloc and opposed Western integration of the FRG. In 1960 the club joined with the Bund der Deutschen and the Vereinigung unabhängiger Sozialisten (Union of Independent Socialists) the new formation Deutsche Friedensunion (German Peace Union). The journal Blätter für deutsche und internationale Politik that was founded in 1956, was associated with the club.
