= Karl von Westphalen =

German politician and journalist

Karl Graf von Westphalen (August 12, 1898 in Münster – October 18, 1975 in Bonn) was a German politician and journalist.

Westphalen joined the CDU in 1945. As a member of the left wing of the party, he soon began to oppose the policies of Konrad Adenauer. In 1952 he left the CDU in protest against the policies of attachment to the West and founded the German Club 1954 (Deutscher Klub 1954), which had a national-neutralist program, just like the Bund der Deutschen. In 1956 he delivered a speech as a guest at the party conference of the Christian Democratic Party of East Germany. After the foundation of the German Peace Union (Deutsche Friedensunion), he acted as a member of its presidium from 1962 to 1966. Westphalen made numerous contributions to the Deutsche Volkszeitung and also founded the journal Blätter für deutsche und internationale Politik.
