= Westphalia, Texas =

- Unincorporated community
- Location within Texas Location within the United States
- Coordinates: 31°07′09″N 97°06′55″W
- Country: United States of America
- State: Texas
- County: Falls
- Elevation: 574 ft (175 m)

Population (2000)
  - Total: 186
- Time zone: UTC-6 (Central (CST))
  - Summer (DST): UTC-5 (CDT)
- ZIP code: 76656
- Area code: 254
- GNIS feature ID: 1371303

Westphalia is a small unincorporated community in Falls County, Texas, United States, located 35 mi (56 km) south of Waco on State Highway 320. Westphalia has a strong German and Catholic background. The Church of the Visitation was, until recently, the largest wooden church west of the Mississippi River. Westphalia is mainly noted for its historic church and convents, but also for its meat market and for its annual church picnic, which is one of the largest in the area. Westphalia is also known for the Westphalia Waltz.

The Westphalia Independent School District serves area students.

== Westphalia Rural Historic District ==
- Westphalia Rural Historic District
- U.S. National Register of Historic Places
- U.S. Historic district
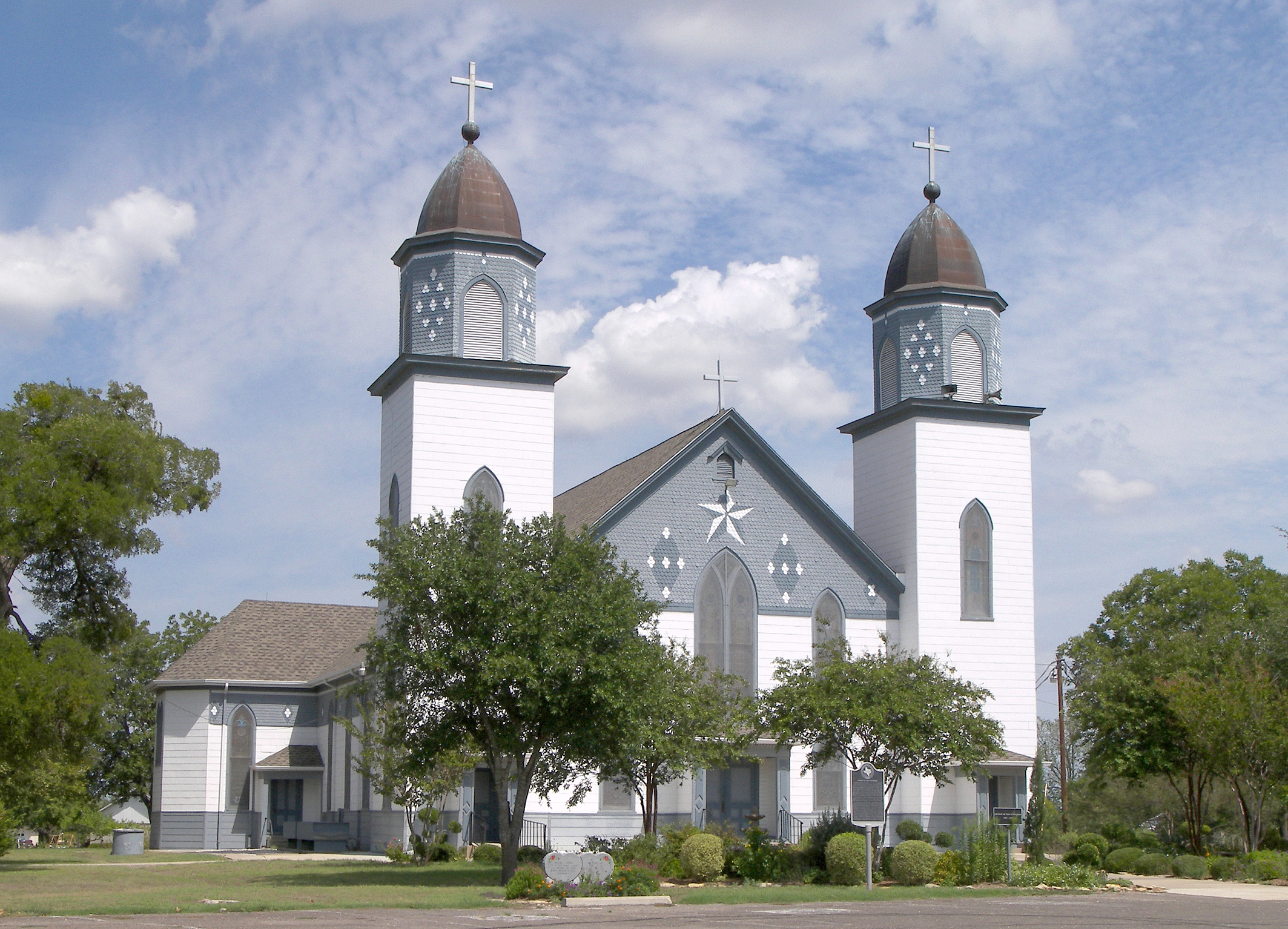
- Church of the Visitation in 2008

- Location within Texas Location within the United States
- Location: Roughly bounded by Co. Rt. 383, Pond Cr., Co. Rts. 377, 368, 372, 373, and the Falls Co. western boundary line, Westphalia, Texas
- Coordinates: 31°7′0″N 97°7′0″W
- Area: 5,500 acres (2,200 ha)
- Built: 1879
- Architectural style: Bungalow/Craftsman
- NRHP reference No.: 96000524
- Added to NRHP: May 15, 1996

The entire town of Westphalia, along with a large 5,500-acre (2,200 ha) swath of surrounding countryside, is listed on the National Register of Historic Places (NRHP) since 1996 as the Westphalia Rural Historic District. The district lies at the center of a broader rural farming community culturally bound through German Catholic traditions. The town of Westphalia is home to the region's Catholic parish, the religious institutions supported by the parish, the schools, and commercial businesses that grew up to serve local farmers. Outside of Westphalia, the district holds 35 historic farmsteads containing late 19th- and early 20th-century residential and agricultural buildings still retaining a high degree of integrity in their environment, design, materials, and workmanship.

Westphalia, never formally platted or incorporated, historically is situated along three principal streets, and is composed of four distinct sections. Church Road, now known as County Road 3000, forms a northern district featuring the Church of the Visitation of the Blessed Virgin and its rectory and parish hall, cemetery, schools, and a former convent. These structures were formerly on large lots, but in later years, residential infill has been added. The Main Village Road, now CR 366 and CR 380, was the center of the town's commercial development at the intersections of the other two streets until 1938 when State Highway 320 (SH 320) was constructed through town, reorienting the town's business settlement pattern. Cotton Gin Road, now CR 366 south of CR 380, led to the cotton gin that served as Westphalia's only industrial infrastructure on the southwest of town. Initially, the town's residences formed the fourth section along the Main Village Rd. east of and near the commercial center.

Outside of town, agrarian lands within the district were originally structured in a rectangular grid pattern with roughly 270-acre (110 ha) tracts broken only by wooded areas along streams and later by the diagonal path of SH 320. Although some large tracts have been further subdivided beginning in the 1910s, the modern county road network along with fence lines and their associated vegetation respect this historically rectangular framework. Common land uses including widespread corn, cotton, and livestock production along with shared agricultural practices including seasonally consistent farming methods give the farmsteads a uniform appearance that reflects its late 19th-century appearance. The twin steeples of the Church of the Visitation in Westphalia form a commanding presence, being visible from most locations throughout the district.

The district contains 283 contributing resources, including 188 buildings, 43 sites, 50 structures, and two objects, along with 127 total noncontributing resources. The district's NRHP registration form specifies the following properties as being representative of the district including one that is also a Recorded Texas Historic Landmark (RTHL):

- The Church of the Visitation of the Blessed Virgin, Church Rd. (CR 3000) — Constructed from 1894-1895, the church follows a Latin cross plan measuring 120 by 55 feet (37 by 17 m) with a 20-foot (6.1 m) by 30-foot (9.1 m) transept. The building has a symmetrical facade dominated by twin 80-foot (24 m) bell towers topped by copper-clad domes and Maltese crosses, a common German symbol, along with Gothic windows and fish-scale shingles. The church's design and construction are reminiscent of the German Westphalia region that was the homeland of the town's immigrant pioneers, although the church is more subdued than most similar churches in the town's namesake region. Restoration efforts have provided a distinctive blue and white paint scheme of folk patterns evident in early photographs. The church's interior includes stained-glass windows and a painting on the ceiling of angels, stars, comets, and the moon. A concrete-lined cistern, a remnant of the town's early water supply, is also a historic element of the property. The church was destroyed by a fire on July 29, 2019 Construction of a new church designed to closely replicate the historic church began in spring 2021 and was dedicated on August 27, 2023.
- St. Mary's Cemetery, Church Rd. (CR 3000) — The cemetery was established circa 1895 on a slightly sloping hill within the church's original 100-acre (40 ha) tract; however, the first recorded grave was dug there earlier in 1884. Although some graves are covered with grass, most are neatly graveled in family plots surrounded by low curbs with gravel pathways between. Headstones face east toward the church, and many older headstones have German inscriptions and are topped with Maltese crosses, providing visual continuity with the church towers. Dominating the center of the cemetery is a bronze statue of the crucified Christ donated by local families and imported from France in 1908. Between the statue and the cemetery entrance is a file of seven concrete slabs, also facing east, covering the graves of former parish priests. A ceremonial wrought-iron arch installed around 1950 marks the entrance. The original wrought-iron fencing remains on the north side, while the rest has been removed due to expansion. A chain-link fence along the rear of the cemetery marks the boundary of the church tract.
- Westphalia Little School, Church Rd. (CR 3000) — This school, built in 1896 likely incorporating ruins from the later of two previous church buildings, is located on the hill near the present church. The vernacular frame building is similar to center-passage dwellings commonly built at the time. The three-room school includes a wing added to the rear typical of the expansion of the area's farmhouses. Other design features common in contemporary structures include the school's pedimented entry portico, fish-scale shingles, and double-hung sash with pedimented surrounds. The building continued serving as a school until 1989.
- Minnie Hoelscher House, Church Rd. (CR 3000) — This house, built before 1890, is the earliest known residence within Westphalia and belonged to Minnie Hoelscher, a dressmaker and milliner. The 1 1/2-story, two-room home was typical of many contemporary farmhouses. Modest adornments include turned porch brackets and paired turned posts. Despite the home's modest size, Miss Hoelscher opened her home to boarders. The agricultural property also includes a barn, shed, and well.
- Dr. B.A. and Katie Jansing House, Main Village Rd. (CR 366) — This 1921 home is a one-story bungalow located in the town's commercial heart. The house is located on a 1.7-acre (0.69 ha) lot, typical of homes on Westphalia's main road, and belonged to a prominent, long-time physician upon whom the town highly depended. The primary contractor was Tom Roberts of Lott with assistance from Will Ranly of Westphalia. The house demonstrates Craftsman influences, including geometric gable ornamentation, simple box columns, triangular knee braces, and a battered foundational skirt. Despite the addition of asbestos siding in the post-World War II period, a common practice at the time, the home's historical elements remain recognizable.
- Hoelscher/Thornton Store, Main Village Rd. (CR 366) — Built in 1907, the Hoelscher/Thornton Store is distinguished as the oldest remaining commercial building in the historic district. The main entrance of the one-story frame building faces the Main Village Rd., while a secondary, rear entrance has been opened toward SH 320. The false-fronted main facade features a stepped parapet of horizontal boards, and the structure retains its original architectural features, building materials, and interior design. The store originally sold dry goods with groceries sold in a separate building since consumed by fire. Descendants of the original owners still own and operate the business, which continues to serve as a gathering spot for townsfolk.
- Stefka/Hoelscher/Doskocil Cotton Gin, Cotton Gin Rd. (CR 366) — The cotton gin was built around 1930 on the southwestern edge of town abutting extensive cotton fields. This gin replaced an earlier one located about 1.5 miles (2.4 km) to the west. The original cruciform plan of the gin remains recognizable despite numerous technological alterations both contributing and not contributing to its historical integrity. The cotton gin remains operational and continues to serve the local agricultural community.
- Christopher and Mary Fuchs Farmstead, SH 320 — Christopher and Mary Fuchs, immigrants from Germany, obtained title to a formerly 200-acre (81 ha) tract upon which this farmstead sits in 1890 and finished payments for the property by 1900, although by this time, they no longer farmed. The farmhouse is among the oldest buildings in the district, and the current farmstead property includes more than a dozen outbuildings. The historic structures of the farmstead represent all significant historic periods of the district and remain largely unaltered, rendering the farmstead an epitome of first-generation Westphalia farms. The original farmstead has been subdivided through inheritance and subjected to land swaps among the descendants of the Fuchs family, leaving the current property with the original farmhouse on a parcel of 108 acres (44 ha). This acreage includes 87.1 acres (35.2 ha) of cropland and 20.3 acres (8.2 ha) of pastureland which itself contains 6 acres (2.4 ha) of prairie grass in a hay meadow that has never been plowed. This expanse of indigenous grassland is a rarity, lending this property special significance within the district's historic context. The farmstead conforms to common local patterns with a building complex centrally located within the cultivated fields. A barbed-wire fence with cedar posts and lined with wild vegetation runs along a dirt road between the fields and the building compound. Decorative wire fencing separates the barnyard from the main house's yard, which is planted with large trees, roses, and other flower beds. The 1890-era family domicile itself is a 1 1/2-story frame house built in the region's common center-passage style with a rear ell. A full-length porch fronts a five-bay façade and features chamfered posts, a gabled roof with twin dormers, and a side-lighted central front door. A hard-packed drive separates the house from the barnyard structures. These include a rectangular, one-story chicken coop with a chimney allowing for chick incubation as early as January. Four hog pens are made up of double pens with frame fencing. Several large animal barns of one and two stories and a 1 1/2-story barn with a hay loft also remain. Other barnyard historic features include storage and garage outbuildings, a plot for vegetable and flower cultivation, a well, and an old privy. Historic barnyard structures are of frame construction with either wood shingle or metal roofs, while noncontributing structures, built since the 1960s, are of metal construction.
- Anton Jansing Estate, CR 372 — Anton Jansing was one of the earliest German Catholic settlers arriving in 1888, and helped establish the parish church before his death 10 years later. Although the house and some outbuildings remain intact, the historic nature of the surrounding fields has been obscured by modern commercial agriculture. The present farmstead, part of what was originally a 227-acre (92 ha) tract, is dominated by the farmhouse built around 1890. The home, built on a center-passage plan, features a pedimented front door with transom and side lights, pedimented 4/4 windows, and a pedimented front porch with fish-scale shingles. Across a hard-packed drive leading to the county road from the main house is the barnyard compound. This once more substantial complex holds three remaining main buildings that are historically similar to other structures within the district. These are a two-story hay and animal barn with board corrals and open cattle bays, a one-story frame barn, and a metal garage with hasp-hinged doors.
- Elizabeth Biemer Farmstead, CR 378 — This farmstead, with a house built around 1915, is considered a typical example of a second-generation property within the district. Elizabeth Biemer was a German immigrant whose native-born Texan husband died within a few years after acquiring this property, leaving her to tend the farm along with her four children. This is an early 20th-century standard-plan house with a high-pitched, hipped roof. Historic outbuildings include a one-story frame barn and a one-story garage with large hasp-hung doors. Noncontributing modern structures include a shed, a metal barn, and a cattle feeder. Elsewhere, the fence lines and tree-shaded pasture enhance the farm's historic character, while an intensely cultivated field is a detraction.
- Joseph and Clothilde Kahlig Farmstead, CR 378 — Joseph A. Kahlig obtained this property in 1884 and lived with his wife in a small log house along a creek until building the farmhouse around 1890. The farmhouse, very representative of others in the district and one of the oldest, is a 1 1/2-story central-passage structure with a rear ell. Among the outbuildings are a two-story metal hay barn, a 1 1/2-story metal animal barn, a one-story frame root cellar, a tractor barn, a buggy barn, a chicken house, a pig pen, and a working well. These are part of an elevated building complex, while other landscape aspects of the farm include an expanse of flat land for cotton cultivation and a grassy slope and large stock pond for cattle grazing.
- G.P. Hoelscher Farmstead, CR 388 — This farmstead was originally part of a subsequently divided 200-acre (81 ha) tract. The farmstead contains 10 historic buildings along with an ornamental garden, while a second house on another subdivided section of the original property dates to 1908. The G.P. Hoelscher House, built around 1890, is yet another central-passage dwelling common in the district. This 1 1/2-story house is very similar to the Christopher Fuchs House with three gabled dormers and a front porch that was replaced during the district's period of historic interest. Surrounding the home is a yard common among homes in the district with a decorative metal gate and fencing enclosure with symmetrical plantings of trees and shrubs. Rose bushes are planted along the east side of the house, while the front porch is flanked with holly and crape myrtles. Pecan trees shade the house from each of the fence corners. Among the outbuildings are a 1 1/2-story frame hay barn, a 1 1/2-story frame garage with hasp hinged doors, a one-story tractor shed, a one-story frame corn crib, a hen house, a frame privy, a brick cistern and concrete-sheathed brick well, and a hot water house/wash house. This building complex again is placed upon an elevated place within the farmstead, which also features cedar-post fence rows and a timber stand along a creek.
- Henry Meyer Farmstead, CR 386 — Despite the dilapidated state of much of this property, it remains sufficiently intact to demonstrate crucial elements of the district's historical traditions. The farmhouse is in an I-layout design, the only remaining such structure in the district, although the layout was formerly more common among vernacular buildings in the area, including a nonextant former church rectory. This building, dating from around 1900, also has a vernacular central-passage design with a rear ell. The two-story house has a collapsed full-width porch, unfortunately representative of other vacant historic properties in the district. The home's yard includes a concrete-sheathed brick well and a deteriorated frame privy. Outbuildings include a three-bay 1 1/2-story hay barn, a one-story frame shed, and an open-sided animal barn with corrals. The concrete foundation of a sanitary pit toilet constructed around 1935 by the Works Progress Administration is located nearby.

- Frank J. and Julia Bockholt Farmstead (RTHL #13048), CR 379 — Frank Bockholt inherited this portion of the original farm from his father, alternatively known as either Alois or Johann Bockholt, and his mother Theresia. This 1912 home is considered a second-generation house within the district. The house incorporates elements of the previous two-room home built by Frank Buckholt's parents, who settled in the area in 1881 and in which Buckholt was raised since his birth in 1884. After studying music at St. Edward's in Austin, Buckholt returned home to be the organist for 52 years at the Catholic church and director of the men's choir. The 1 1/2-story hipped roof bungalow house built in 1912 of American Four Square design represents a style between Craftsman and late Victorian that remains largely unaltered. The home was constructed by carpenters Crier and Sapp. What remains of the farm's outbuildings of frame construction with either board-and-batten or vertical board design include a two-story hay and cattle barn, two one-story chicken houses, a one-story garage and work shed, and a one-story storage and garage building. A metal feed silo and a few pig pens complete the barnyard building complex separated from the house by a field road. Beyond these, the historic nature of cultivated areas has effectively been destroyed due to leasing to modern agricultural interests that have disrupted traditional field patterns and removed fence rows.

== See also ==
- National Register of Historic Places listings in Falls County, Texas
- Recorded Texas Historic Landmarks in Falls County
