= Jens Westphalen =

German wildlife filmmaker, director and film producer (born 1964)

- Born: Jens Westphalen; 1964 (age 61–62); Hamburg, Germany
- Occupations: Wildlife filmmaker, director, film producer
- Years active: 1993–present (as filmmaker)
- Notable work: Wildes Japan (2009)
- Partner: Thoralf Grospitz (long-time film partner)
- Awards: International Emmy Award (Nomination for Wildes Japan, 2011), Deutscher Naturfilmpreis (for Australien – im Reich der Riesenkängurus)

Jens Westphalen (born 1964 in Hamburg) is a German wildlife filmmaker, director and film producer. His documentaries have received many awards.

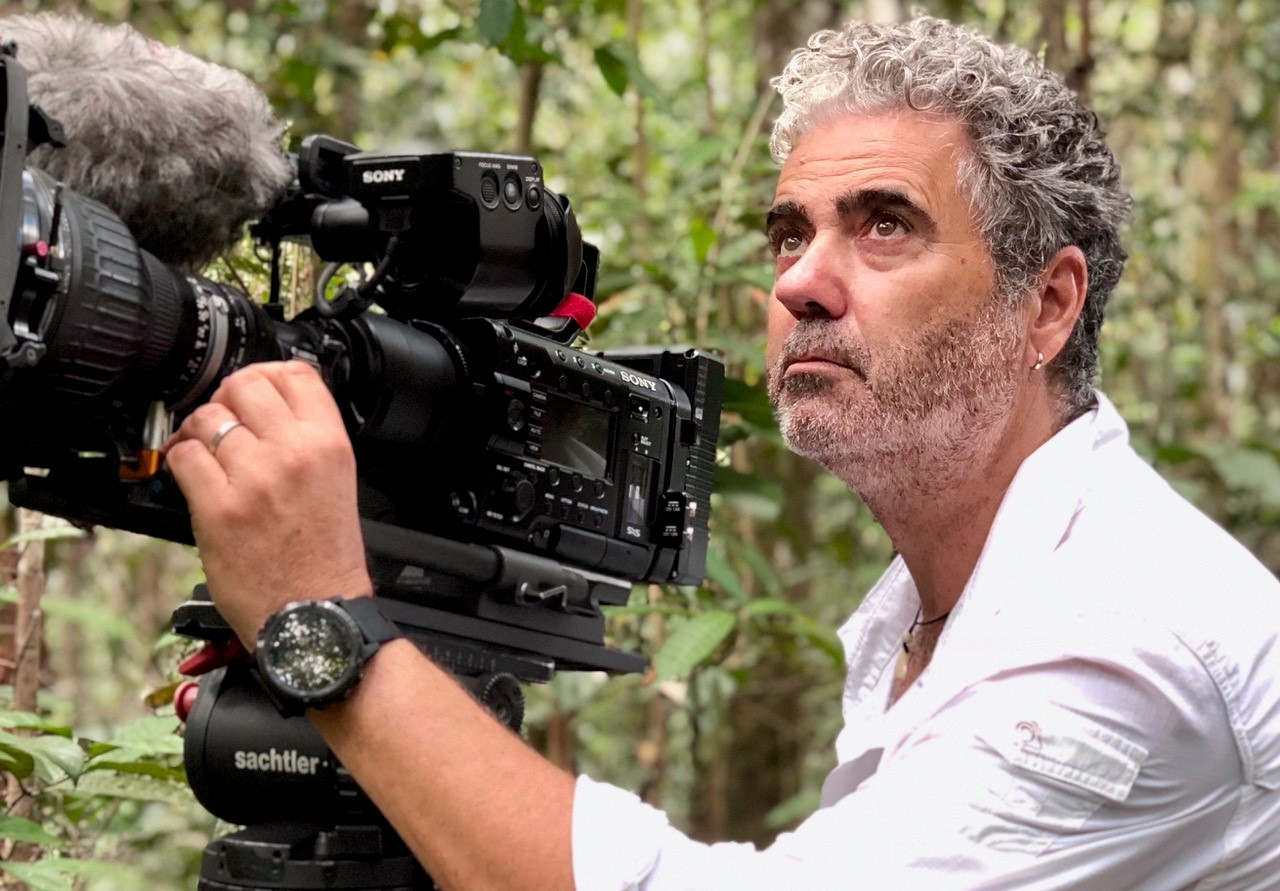
Jens Westphalen while filming in Borneo, 2018

== Life and career ==
Jens Westphalen grew up in Hamburg-Langenhorn. During his childhood and youth he was interested in animals and nature, photography and film. This also led to his early desire to become a wildlife filmmaker. After graduating from high school in Heidberg, Jens Westphalen traveled through South America for a year and gained his first experiences as a professional photographer. Jens Westphalen then did community service and then studied biology at the University of Hamburg. Jens Westphalen then worked as a nature photographer in Africa, Asia, Europe and South America, mainly during the semester breaks. While studying biology, Jens Westphalen met his fellow student Thoralf Grospitz. He began making his first nature films with him before he finished his studies. They later founded the production company Zorillafilm. Animal and nature films such as Die Nordsee (The North Sea), Wildes Japan (Wild Japan) and the Australien (Australia) series have been made since 1993. The documentaries portray natural areas such as "Poland's East", "Borneo's Secret Kingdom" and "Wild Hamburg" or animal species such as African elephants, dingoes, red kangaroos and sea turtles. But Jens Westphalen is not only taken with large and exotic animals: in 2003 the film Die frechen Spatzen von Berlin (The Cheeky Sparrows of Berlin) was made.

In addition to various European countries, these include: Costa Rica, India, Sri Lanka, New Zealand, Australia, Borneo, Namibia, Zambia, Botswana and Japan are Jens Westphalen's filming locations. On his film trips he usually travels for months and often in remote areas with his film partner Thoralf Grospitz.

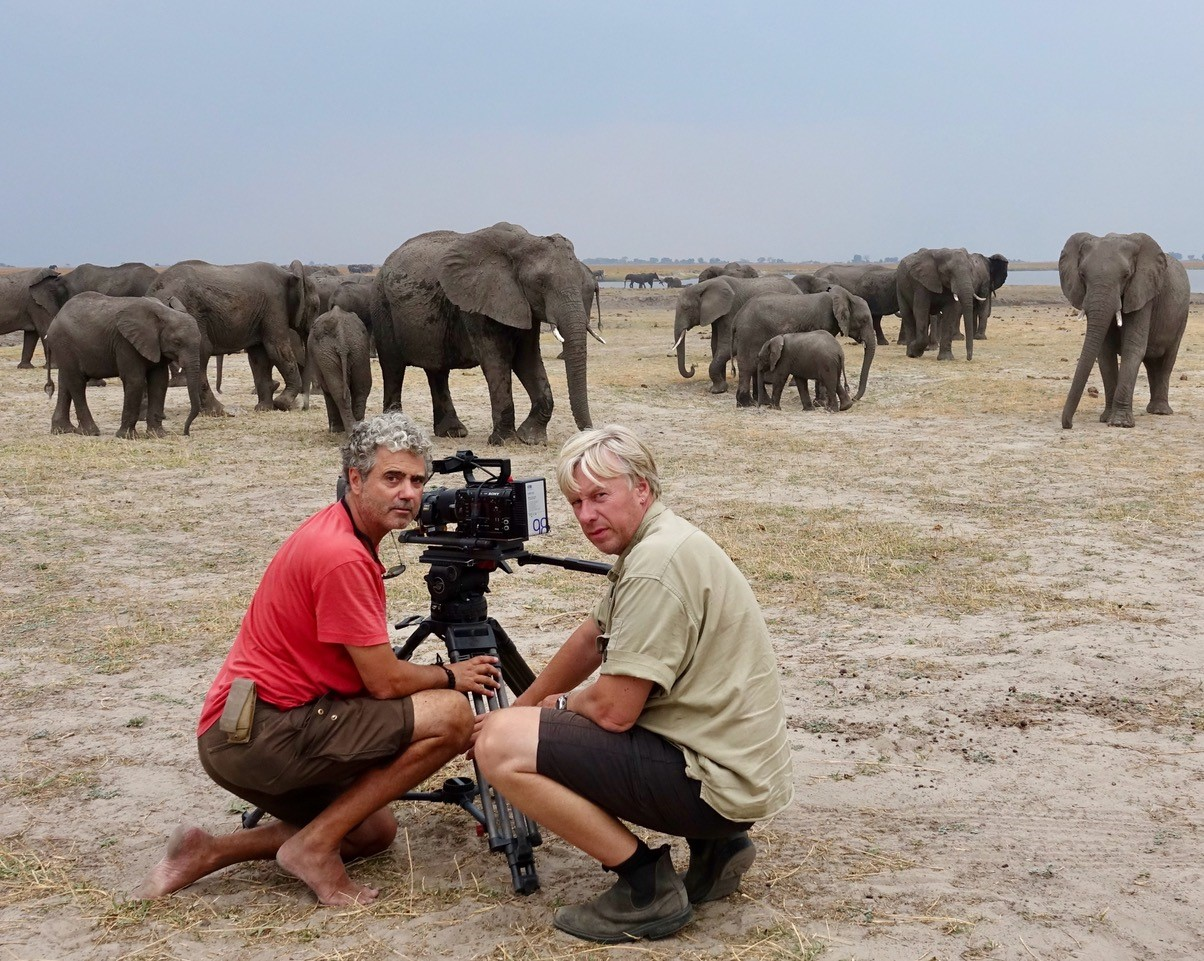
Jens Westphalen and Thoralf Grospitz with elefants, Botswana, 2017

Numerous documentaries have received nominations and awards at international film festivals and television awards. In 2011, the two-parter Wild Japan received a nomination for Best Documentary at the International Emmy Award. Other films also received honors: For example, the film Australien – im Reich der Riesenkängurus (Australia – in the realm of the giant kangaroos) won the Deutschen Naturfilmpreis (German Nature Film Prize), the "Best Camera" award at the Green Screen Nature Film Festival, "Best Film" at the Animal Behavior Society and the "Grand Prix" at the Matsalu International Nature Film Festival. Films have also received awards at the New York Festivals several times. Jens Westphalen is therefore one of the most renowned German nature filmmakers.

Jens Westphalen and his film partner Thoralf Grospitz have established themselves on the international television market with their productions and work together with television stations and production companies such as ARD, ZDF, NDR, WDR, BR, Arte, ORF, Deutsche Welle, NDR Naturfilm Doclights, National Geographic Channel, Terra Mater Factual Studios and Wildbear Entertainment.

Jens Westphalen's documentaries are shown in Germany, among others, in the ARD series Erlebnis Erde (Experience Earth) and in the NDR series Expeditionen ins Tierreich(Expeditions into the Animal Kingdom). He also worked for the children's series Die Sendung mit der Maus (The Show with the Mouse) and Löwenzahn (Dandelion).

Jens Westphalen lives with his family in Hamburg.

== Filmography ==
- 1994: Halali im Nationalpark, für den NDR
- 1995: Lippenbären und wilde Büffel – Nationalparks in Sri Lanka, für den NDR
- 1996: Wo die Biber Burgen bauen, für NDR und Deutsche Welle Transtel
- 1997: Invasion aus dem Meer (Costa Rica), für NDR und Deutsche Welle Transtel
- 1997: Helgoland – Vogelparadies auf steilen Klippen, für den NDR
- 1999: Die bunten Vögel vom Rhein, für WDR
- 1999: Sylt - Von Seehunden und Seeschwalben, für NDR
- 1999: Wamba der Waschbär, 7 Teile, für die Sendung mit der Maus
- 2000: Moa - Das Rätsel der Riesenvögel, für ZDF
- 2002: Vorsicht Dingos! Für NDR und HIT Entertainment
- 2003: Beuteltiger - verzweifelt gesucht, für ZDF
- 2003: Die frechen Spatzen von Berlin, für NDR Naturfilm
- 2005: Wilde Heimat für NDR Naturfilm und ORF
- 2005: Die Nordsee - Von Schottland zu den Halligen für NDR Naturfilm und Arte
- 2005: Die Nordsee - Vom Watt zu den Fjorden für NDR Naturfilm und Arte
- 2006: Haie, Hummer, Helgoland für NDR Naturfilm
- 2006: Seehund ahoi! für den NDR
- 2009: Wildes Japan - Tropenstrand und Bärenland für NDR Naturfilm Doclights, Arte, ORF, Parthenon Entertainment
- 2009: Wildes Japan - Schneeaffen und Vulkane für NDR Naturfilm Doclights, Arte, ORF, Parthenon Entertainment
- 2010: Wildes Deutschland - Nordfriesland für NDR Naturfilm Doclights, BR, Arte
- 2010: Wildes Hamburg - Tiere in der Stadt für NDR Naturfilm Doclights und Arte
- 2013: Die Nordsee - Unser Meer für NDR Naturfilm Doclights
- 2014: Das Abenteuer für NDR Naturfilm Doclights, National Geographic Wild, Arte, Terra Mater
- 2014: Australien - In den Wäldern der Koalas für NDR Naturfilm Doclights, National Geographic Wild, Arte, Terra Mater
- 2014: Australien - Im Dschungel der Riesenvögel für NDR Naturfilm Doclights, National Geographic Wild, Arte, Terra Mater
- 2014: Australien - Im Reich der Riesenkängurus für NDR Naturfilm Doclights, National Geographic Wild, Arte, Terra Mater
- 2014: Big Red - The Kangaroo King für Wildbear Entertainment, National Geographic Wild, NDR Naturfilm Doclights
- 2016: Borneo's Secret Kingdom, für Wildbear Entertainment, National Geographic Wild, ZDF Enterprises. (Dreiteilige Serie)
- 2018: Elefanten hautnah - Ungewöhnliche Nachbarn für NDR Naturfilm, Doclights, NDR, Arte, ORF
- 2018: Elefanten hautnah - Giganten mit Gefühl für NDR Naturfilm, Doclights, NDR, Arte, ORF
- 2019: Ein Jahr unter Elefanten - Zwei Hamburger im Süden Afrikas für NDR Naturfilm Doclights, NDR, Arte
- 2022: Polens Osten - Zwischen Wisenten, Wölfen und Elchen für NDR Naturfilm Doclights, NDR, Arte, ORF
- 2023: Namibias Naturwunder - Leben am Limit für NDR Naturfilm Doclights, NDR, Arte, ORF
- 2023: Namibias Naturwunder - Kleine Helden, große Jäger für NDR Naturfilm Doclights, NDR, Arte, ORF

== Links ==
- Zorillafilm Grospitz und Westphalen Filmproduktion
- Interview mit Westphalen und Grospitz im NDR 2010 (in German)
- Jens Westphalen on IMDB
