= Westphalia Township, Kansas =

Westphalia Township
- Township
- Location in Anderson County
- Coordinates: 38°12′20″N 095°26′36″W
- Country: United States
- State: Kansas
- County: Anderson

Area
  - Total: 51.7 sq mi (134.0 km^{2})
  - Land: 51.4 sq mi (133.1 km^{2})
  - Water: 0.35 sq mi (0.9 km^{2}) 0.68%
- Elevation: 1,040 ft (317 m)

Population (2010)
  - Total: 372
  - Density: 7.3/sq mi (2.8/km^{2})
- GNIS feature ID: 0477652

Westphalia Township is a township in Anderson County, Kansas, United States. As of the 2010 census, its population was 372.

== Geography ==
Westphalia Township covers an area of 51.7 square miles (134.0 km^{2}) and contains one incorporated settlement, Westphalia. According to the USGS, it contains one cemetery, Saint Teresa.

The stream of Cherry Creek runs through this township.
