= Westphalia, Kansas =

City in Anderson County, Kansas, United States

- City
- Location within Anderson County and Kansas

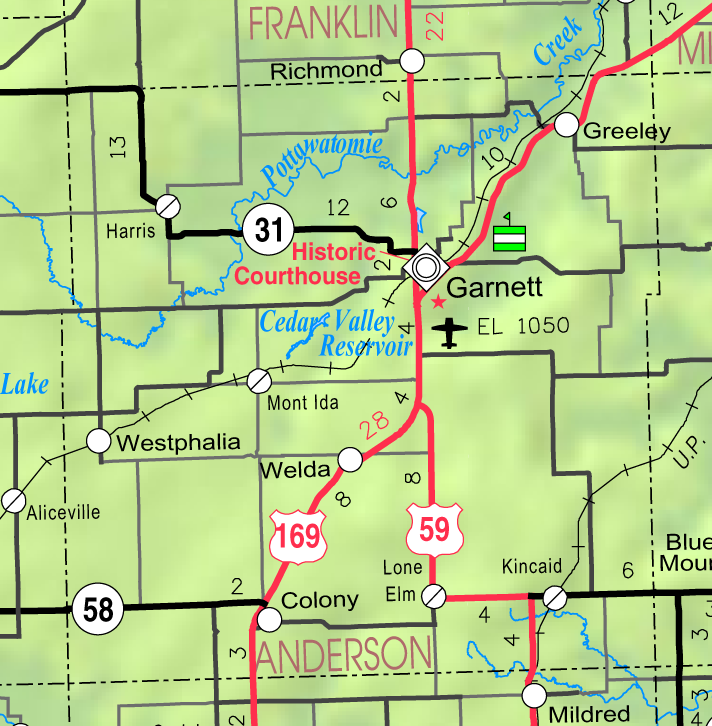
- KDOT map of Anderson County (legend)
- Coordinates: 38°10′55″N 95°29′26″W
- Country: United States
- State: Kansas
- County: Anderson
- Township: Westphalia
- Founded: 1880
- Platted: 1880
- Incorporated: 1920

Area
  - Total: 0.20 sq mi (0.52 km^{2})
  - Land: 0.20 sq mi (0.51 km^{2})
  - Water: 0 sq mi (0.00 km^{2})
- Elevation: 1,102 ft (336 m)

Population (2020)
  - Total: 128
  - Density: 650/sq mi (250/km^{2})
- Time zone: UTC-6 (CST)
  - Summer (DST): UTC-5 (CDT)
- ZIP Code: 66093
- Area code: 785
- FIPS code: 20-77250
- GNIS ID: 2397285

Westphalia is a city in Westphalia Township, Anderson County, Kansas, United States. As of the 2020 census, the population of the city was 128.

== History ==
Westphalia was platted in 1880 when the railroad was extended to that point. It was originally built up mainly by Germans.

The first photograph of a tornado was taken in Westphalia on April 26, 1884.

The first post office in Westphalia was established in June 1880.

== Geography ==
According to the United States Census Bureau, the city has a total area of 0.19 square miles (0.49 km^{2}), all land.

== Demographics ==
Historical population
Census	Pop.	Note	%±
1930	326		—
1940	314		−3.7%
1950	254		−19.1%
1960	249		−2.0%
1970	185		−25.7%
1980	204		10.3%
1990	152		−25.5%
2000	165		8.6%
2010	163		−1.2%
2020	128		−21.5%
U.S. Decennial Census

=== 2010 census ===
As of the census of 2010, there were 163 people, 62 households, and 39 families residing in the city. The population density was 857.9 inhabitants per square mile (331.2/km^{2}). There were 77 housing units at an average density of 405.3 per square mile (156.5/km^{2}). The racial makeup of the city was 90.2% White, 1.8% African American, 1.8% Native American, 0.6% from other races, and 5.5% from two or more races. Hispanic or Latino of any race were 2.5% of the population.

There were 62 households, of which 43.5% had children under the age of 18 living with them, 43.5% were married couples living together, 12.9% had a female householder with no husband present, 6.5% had a male householder with no wife present, and 37.1% were non-families. 33.9% of all households were made up of individuals, and 16.2% had someone living alone who was 65 years of age or older. The average household size was 2.63 and the average family size was 3.41.

The median age in the city was 30.3 years. 36.8% of residents were under the age of 18; 4.9% were between the ages of 18 and 24; 24.6% were from 25 to 44; 19.6% were from 45 to 64; and 14.1% were 65 years of age or older. The gender makeup of the city was 48.5% male and 51.5% female.

=== 2000 census ===
As of the census of 2000, there were 165 people, 66 households, and 39 families residing in the city. The population density was 834.8 inhabitants per square mile (322.3/km^{2}). There were 75 housing units at an average density of 379.5 per square mile (146.5/km^{2}). The racial makeup of the city was 95.15% White, 1.82% Native American, and 3.03% from two or more races. Hispanic or Latino of any race were 1.82% of the population.

There were 66 households, out of which 36.4% had children under the age of 18 living with them, 51.5% were married couples living together, 6.1% had a female householder with no husband present, and 40.9% were non-families. 36.4% of all households were made up of individuals, and 22.7% had someone living alone who was 65 years of age or older. The average household size was 2.50 and the average family size was 3.41.

In the city, the population was spread out, with 33.3% under the age of 18, 9.1% from 18 to 24, 26.1% from 25 to 44, 17.6% from 45 to 64, and 13.9% who were 65 years of age or older. The median age was 37 years. For every 100 females, there were 108.9 males. For every 100 females age 18 and over, there were 83.3 males.

The median income for a household in the city was $23,500, and the median income for a family was $28,125. Males had a median income of $24,167 versus $13,125 for females. The per capita income for the city was $10,305. About 30.8% of families and 29.2% of the population were below the poverty line, including 33.3% of those under the age of eighteen and 60.0% of those 65 or over.

== Education ==
The community is served by Garnett USD 365 public school district, and operates Westphalia Elementary School in Westphalia and Anderson County Junior-Senior High School in Garnett.

== See also ==
- National Register of Historic Places listings in Anderson County, Kansas
