= Poumbly =

Poumbly Poumbli
- Village
- Location in Ivory Coast
- Coordinates: 7°22′N 7°14′W
- Country: Ivory Coast
- District: Montagnes
- Region: Guémon
- Department: Kouibly
- Sub-prefecture: Ouyably-Gnondrou
- Time zone: UTC+0 (GMT)

Poumbly (also spelled Poumbli) is a village in western Ivory Coast. It is in the sub-prefecture of Ouyably-Gnondrou, Kouibly Department, Guémon Region, Montagnes District.

Poumbly was a commune until March 2012, when it became one of 1,126 communes nationwide that were abolished.
