= Gbofesso-Sama =

Gbofesso-Sama Bofesso-Sama
- Village
- Location in Ivory Coast
- Coordinates: 7°34′N 7°32′W
- Country: Ivory Coast
- District: Montagnes
- Region: Tonkpi
- Department: Man
- Sub-prefecture: Sandougou-Soba
- Time zone: UTC+0 (GMT)

Gbofesso-Sama (also spelled Bofesso-Sama) is a village in western Ivory Coast. It is in the sub-prefecture of Sandougou-Soba, Man Department, Tonkpi Region, Montagnes District.

Gbofesso-Sama was a commune until March 2012, when it became one of 1,126 communes nationwide that were abolished.
