= Guiamapleu =

- Village
- Location in Ivory Coast
- Coordinates: 6°39′N 8°20′W
- Country: Ivory Coast
- District: Montagnes
- Region: Tonkpi
- Department: Zouan-Hounien
- Sub-prefecture: Goulaleu
- Time zone: UTC+0 (GMT)

Guiamapleu is a village in the far west of Ivory Coast. It is in the sub-prefecture of Goulaleu, Zouan-Hounien Department, Tonkpi Region, Montagnes District.

Guiamapleu was a commune until March 2012, when it became one of 1,126 communes nationwide that were abolished.
