= Glangleu =

- Village
- Location in Ivory Coast
- Coordinates: 6°51′N 8°15′W
- Country: Ivory Coast
- District: Montagnes
- Region: Tonkpi
- Department: Zouan-Hounien
- Sub-prefecture: Zouan-Hounien
- Time zone: UTC+0 (GMT)

Glangleu is a village in the far west of Ivory Coast. It is in the sub-prefecture of Zouan-Hounien, Zouan-Hounien Department, Tonkpi Region, Montagnes District. The village is seven kilometres east of the border with Liberia.

Glangleu was a commune until March 2012, when it became one of 1,126 communes nationwide that were abolished.
