= Gourané =

- Village
- Location in Ivory Coast
- Coordinates: 7°37′N 7°18′W
- Country: Ivory Coast
- District: Montagnes
- Region: Tonkpi
- Department: Biankouma
- Sub-prefecture: Gbonné
- Time zone: UTC+0 (GMT)

Gourané is a village in western Ivory Coast. It is in the sub-prefecture of Gbonné, Biankouma Department, Tonkpi Region, Montagnes District.

Gourané was a commune until March 2012, when it became one of 1,126 communes nationwide that were abolished.
