= Yrozon =

- Village
- Location in Ivory Coast
- Coordinates: 6°50′N 7°13′W
- Country: Ivory Coast
- District: Montagnes
- Region: Guémon
- Department: Duékoué
- Sub-prefecture: Bagohouo
- Time zone: UTC+0 (GMT)

Yrozon is a village in western Ivory Coast. It is in the sub-prefecture of Bagohouo, Duékoué Department, Guémon Region, Montagnes District.

Yrozon was a commune until March 2012, when it became one of 1,126 communes nationwide that were abolished.
