= Gotongouiné 1 =

- Village
- Location in Ivory Coast
- Coordinates: 7°22′N 7°48′W
- Country: Ivory Coast
- District: Montagnes
- Region: Tonkpi
- Department: Man
- Sub-prefecture: Sangouiné
- Time zone: UTC+0 (GMT)

Gotongouiné 1 is a village in western Ivory Coast. It is in the sub-prefecture of Sangouiné, Man Department, Tonkpi Region, Montagnes District. Two-and-a-half kilometres southeast of the village is the smaller village Gotongouiné 2.

Gotongouiné 1 was a commune until March 2012, when it became one of 1,126 communes nationwide that were abolished.
