= Dibobly =

Dibobly Dibobli
- Village
- Location in Ivory Coast
- Coordinates: 6°44′N 7°1′W
- Country: Ivory Coast
- District: Montagnes
- Region: Guémon
- Department: Duékoué
- Sub-prefecture: Guézon
- Time zone: UTC+0 (GMT)

Dibobly (also spelled Dibobli) is a village in western Ivory Coast. It is in the sub-prefecture of Guézon, Duékoué Department, Guémon Region, Montagnes District. The village is located three kilometres west of the border with Sassandra-Marahoué District.

Dibobly was a commune until March 2012, when it became one of 1,126 communes nationwide that were abolished.
