= Zouatta =

- Village
- Location in Ivory Coast
- Coordinates: 7°28′N 7°21′W
- Country: Ivory Coast
- District: Montagnes
- Region: Guémon
- Department: Facobly
- Sub-prefecture: Facobly
- Time zone: UTC+0 (GMT)

Zouatta is a village in western Ivory Coast. It is in the sub-prefecture of Facobly, Facobly Department, Guémon Region, Montagnes District.

Zouatta was a commune until March 2012, when it became one of 1,126 communes nationwide that were abolished.
