= Koulikoro, Ivory Coast =

Koulikoro Kouroukoro
- Village
- Location in Ivory Coast
- Coordinates: 7°49′N 7°10′W
- Country: Ivory Coast
- District: Montagnes
- Region: Tonkpi
- Department: Biankouma
- Sub-prefecture: Gbonné
- Time zone: UTC+0 (GMT)

Koulikoro (also spelled Kouroukoro) is a village in western Ivory Coast. It is in the sub-prefecture of Gbonné, Biankouma Department, Tonkpi Region, Montagnes District. The area is mostly covered by rainforest. The story goes that Koulikoro was created by Djonta, the father of Basouroukou Sidibé, after his discord with his brothers from the Wasoulou empire spanning Guinea, Ivory Coast and Mali.

== History ==
On 14 July 1749 an annular solar eclipse took place around the village. 2 kilometres away, the greatest eclipse of the day occurred. It lasted 4 minutes, 46 seconds at 12:19 UTC.

Koulikoro was a commune until March 2012, when it was abolished along with 1,126 other communes in the country.
