= Dix-Huit Montagnes =

Coordinates: 7°20′N 7°40′W

Dix-Huit Montagnes Region Région des Dix-Huit Montagnes
- Defunct region of Ivory Coast
- 1997–2011
- Location of Dix-Huit Montagnes Region in Ivory Coast
- Capital: Man
- Area
- 16,782 km^{2} (6,480 sq mi)
- History
  - Established as a first-level subdivision: 1997
  - Divided to create Moyen-Cavally Region: 2000
  - Disestablished: 2011
- Today part of: 1997–2000: Montagnes District; 2000–11: Tonkpi (all) and Guémon (part) regions

Dix-Huit Montagnes Region (often shorted to Montagnes Region) is a defunct region of Ivory Coast. From 1997 to 2011, it was a first-level subdivision region. The region's capital was Man and its area was 16,782 km². Since 2011, the territory formerly encompassed by the region is part of Montagnes District.

== Administrative divisions and geography ==
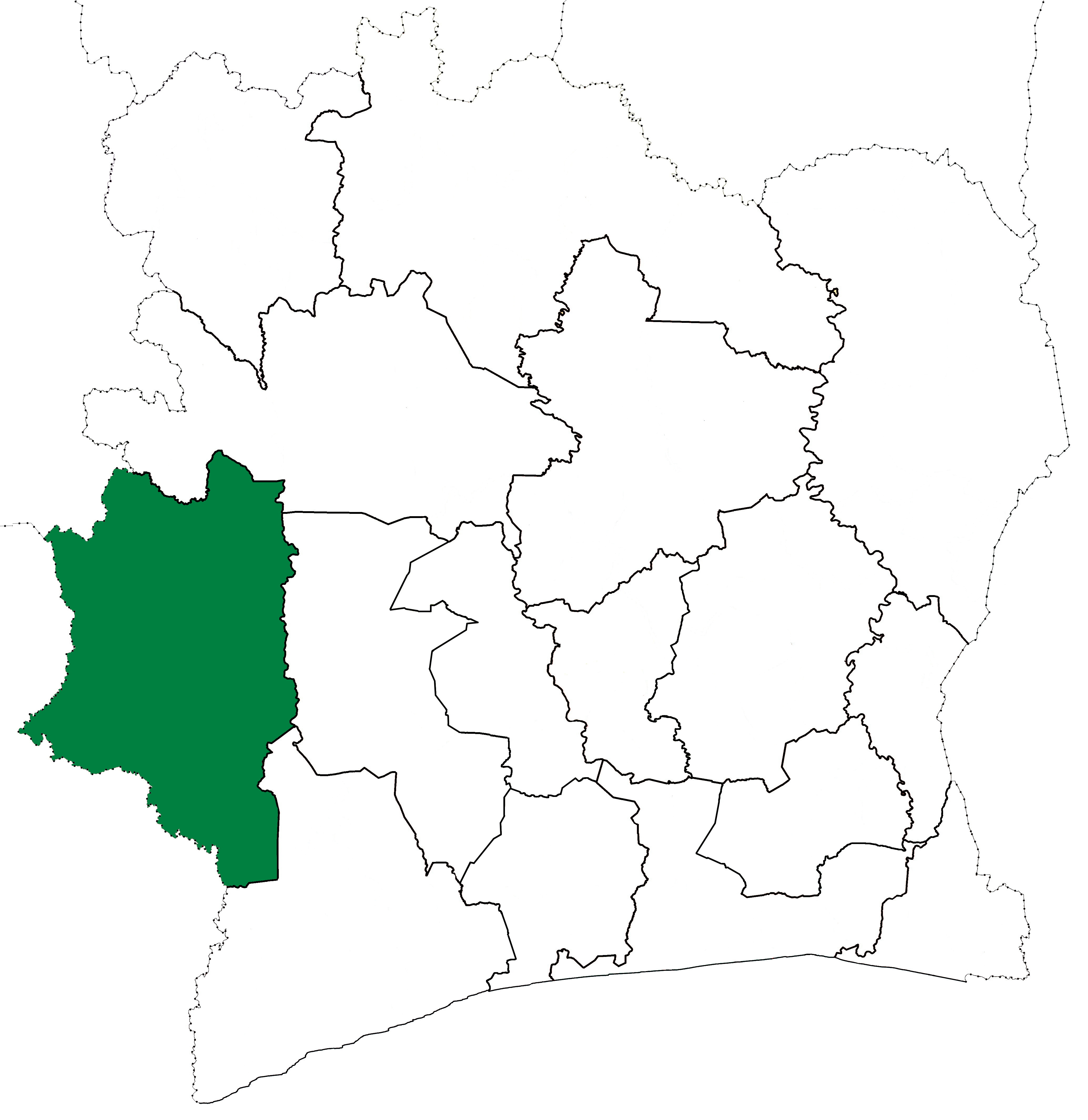
Dix-Huit Montagnes Region upon its creation in 1997. Dix-Huit Montagnes retained these boundaries until 2000, when it was divided to create Moyen-Cavally Region.

When it was created in 1997, Dix-Huit Montagnes occupied the entire territory that is today Montagnes District. However, in 2000, Duékoué, Guiglo, and Toulépleu Departments were split-off from Dix-Huit Montagnes to form Moyen-Cavally Region.

At the time of its dissolution, Dix-Huit Montagnes was divided into six departments: Bangolo, Biankouma, Danané, Kouibly, Man, and Zouan-Hounien.

Dix-Huit Montagnes was traversed by a northwesterly line of equal latitude and longitude.

== Abolition ==
Dix-Huit Montagnes was abolished as part of the 2011 administrative reorganisation of the subdivisions of Ivory Coast. The area formerly encompassed by the region is now part of Montagnes District. The territories of the departments of Biankouma, Danané, Man, and Zouan-Hounien become Tonkpi Region. The territory of the remaining departments, Bangolo and Kouibly, were combined with the former Moyen-Cavally Region's Duékoué Department to create Guémon Region.
