= Koulalé =

- Village
- Location in Ivory Coast
- Coordinates: 7°57′N 8°4′W
- Country: Ivory Coast
- District: Montagnes
- Region: Tonkpi
- Department: Biankouma
- Sub-prefecture: Sipilou
- Time zone: UTC+0 (GMT)

Koulalé is a village in the far west of Ivory Coast. It is in the sub-prefecture of Sipilou, Biankouma Department, Tonkpi Region, Montagnes District. The village is three kilometres east of the border with Guinea, but the nearest official border crossing is seven kilometres to the southwest, near Sipilou.

Koulalé was a commune until March 2012, when it became one of 1,126 communes nationwide that were abolished.
