= Yapleu =

- Town and sub-prefecture
- Location in Ivory Coast
- Coordinates: 7°5′N 7°43′W
- Country: Ivory Coast
- District: Montagnes
- Region: Tonkpi
- Department: Man

Population (2014)
  - Total: 7,735
- Time zone: UTC+0 (GMT)

Yapleu is a town in western Ivory Coast. It is a sub-prefecture of Man Department in Tonkpi Region, Montagnes District.

Yapleu was a commune until March 2012, when it became one of 1,126 communes nationwide that were abolished.

In 2014, the population of the sub-prefecture of Yapleu was 7,735.

== Villages ==
The only two villages of the sub-prefecture of Yapleu and their population in 2014 are:

1. Tontigouiné (1,063)
2. Yapleu (6,672)
