= Tiény-Séably =

- Town and sub-prefecture
- Location in Ivory Coast
- Coordinates: 7°32′N 7°12′W
- Country: Ivory Coast
- District: Montagnes
- Region: Guémon
- Department: Facobly

Population (2014)
  - Total: 8,099
- Time zone: UTC+0 (GMT)

Tiény-Séably is a town in western Ivory Coast. It is a sub-prefecture of Facobly Department in Guémon Region, Montagnes District.

Tiény-Séably was a commune until March 2012, when it became one of 1,126 communes nationwide that were abolished.

In 2014, the population of the sub-prefecture of Tiény-Séably was 8,099.

== Villages ==
The seven villages of the sub-prefecture of Tiény-Séably and their population in 2014 are:

1. Béoué (1,712)
2. Gbadrou (1,005)
3. Kaédrou (623)
4. Sandrou (1,085)
5. Tiény-Séably (1,782)
6. Zé (1,045)
7. Ziondrou (847)
