= Gbangbégouiné-Yati =

- Town and sub-prefecture
- Location in Ivory Coast
- Coordinates: 7°20′N 7°40′W
- Country: Ivory Coast
- District: Montagnes
- Region: Tonkpi
- Department: Man

Population (2014)
  - Total: 10,068
- Time zone: UTC+0 (GMT)

Gbangbégouiné-Yati is a town in western Ivory Coast. It is a sub-prefecture of Man Department in Tonkpi Region, Montagnes District.

Gbangbégouiné-Yati was a commune until March 2012, when it became one of 1,126 communes nationwide that were abolished.

In 2014, the population of the sub-prefecture of Gbangbégouiné-Yati was 10,068.

== Villages ==
The seventeen villages of the sub-prefecture of Gbangbégouiné-Yati and their population in 2014 are:

1. Biakalé (2,091)
2. Bonguiné 1 (579)
3. Bonguiné 2 (980)
4. Doueleu (320)
5. Gbangbé-Douélé (355)
6. Gbangbégouiné-Yati (1,997)
7. Gbangbégouiné-Zélé (689)
8. Gouimpleu 2 (749)
9. Guiapleu (905)
10. Kagui (431)
11. Kampala (357)
12. Kouitongouiné 1 (890)
13. Kouitongouiné 2 (342)
14. Mlongouiné (1,355)
15. Mélapleu (830)
16. Tiakeupleu (220)
17. Zonlé 1 (2,811)
