= Sipilou =

Sipilou Siquita
- Town, sub-prefecture, and commune
- Location in Ivory Coast
- Coordinates: 7°52′N 8°6′W
- Country: Ivory Coast
- District: Montagnes
- Region: Tonkpi
- Department: Sipilou

Population (2014)
  - Total: 22,417
- Time zone: UTC+0 (GMT)

Sipilou (also known as Siquita) is a town in the far west of Ivory Coast. It is a sub-prefecture of and seat of Sipilou Department in Tonkpi Region, Montagnes District. Sipilou is also a commune. Less than three kilometres to the west of the town is a border crossing with Guinea.

In 2014, the population of the sub-prefecture of Sipilou was 22,417.

== Villages ==
The 8 villages of the sub-prefecture of Sipilou and their population in 2014 are:

1. Bloma (1,254)
2. Gaba (1,393)
3. Glangoualé (1,289)
4. Glanlé (5,077)
5. Koulalé (3,654)
6. Sipilou (5,705)
7. Séma (1,495)
8. Yallo (2,550)
