= Yelleu =

- Town and sub-prefecture
- Location in Ivory Coast
- Coordinates: 6°58′N 8°3′W
- Country: Ivory Coast
- District: Montagnes
- Region: Tonkpi
- Department: Zouan-Hounien

Population (2014)
  - Total: 11,203
- Time zone: UTC+0 (GMT)

Yelleu is a town in the far west of Ivory Coast. It is a sub-prefecture of Zouan-Hounien Department in Tonkpi Region, Montagnes District.

Yelleu was a commune until March 2012, when it became one of 1,126 communes nationwide that were abolished.

In 2014, the population of the sub-prefecture of Yelleu was 11,203.

== Villages ==
The ten villages of the sub-prefecture of Yelleu and their population in 2014 are:

1. Bépleu 2 (1,078)
2. Boutouo 2 (352)
3. Glogleu (415)
4. Gohoutouo (662)
5. Gouakatouo (1,160)
6. Gueutouo (757)
7. Natta-Nord (1,394)
8. Niampleu (176)
9. Souampleu (1,802)
10. Yelleu (3,407)
