= Nidrou =

- Town and sub-prefecture
- Location in Ivory Coast
- Coordinates: 7°18′N 7°27′W
- Country: Ivory Coast
- District: Montagnes
- Region: Guémon
- Department: Kouibly

Population (2014)
  - Total: 10,343
- Time zone: UTC+0 (GMT)

Nidrou is a town in western Ivory Coast. It is a sub-prefecture of Kouibly Department in Guémon Region, Montagnes District.

Nidrou was a commune until March 2012, when it became one of 1,126 communes nationwide that were abolished.

In 2014, the population of the sub-prefecture of Nidrou was 10,343.

== Villages ==
The seven villages of the sub-prefecture of Nidrou and their population in 2014 are:

1. Diotrou (1,360)
2. Nidrou (3,359)
3. Oulayably (938)
4. Pany (514)
5. Piandrou (1,098)
6. Sahidrou (664)
7. Trokpadrou (2,410)
