= Téapleu =

- Town and sub-prefecture
- Location in Ivory Coast
- Coordinates: 7°2′N 8°8′W
- Country: Ivory Coast
- District: Montagnes
- Region: Tonkpi
- Department: Zouan-Hounien

Population (2014)
  - Total: 39,224
- Time zone: UTC+0 (GMT)

Téapleu (also spelled Béapleu) is a town in the far west of Ivory Coast. It is a sub-prefecture of Zouan-Hounien Department in Tonkpi Region, Montagnes District.

Téapleu was a commune until March 2012, when it became one of 1,126 communes nationwide that were abolished.

In 2014, the population of the sub-prefecture of Téapleu was 39,244.

== Villages ==
The 33 villages of the sub-prefecture of Téapleu and their population in 2014 are:

1. Bauhiéleu (1,026)
2. Béapleu (746)
3. Blinleu (962)
4. Bopleu 1 (900)
5. Bopleu 2 (109)
6. Boyapleu 1 (228)
7. Boyapleu 2 (157)
8. Danta (565)
9. Déagbangompleu (910)
10. Douatouo 1 (1,020)
11. Douatouo 2 (411)
12. Douépleu (1,230)
13. Finneu (2,027)
14. Gbéapieu (703)
15. Gbloaleu (1,424)
16. Glèpleu (409)
17. Kouyatouo (926)
18. Léampleu-Goualeu (274)
19. Lieupleu (990)
20. Lonneu (2,419)
21. Méampleu (626)
22. Ouelleu (1,167)
23. Petit Zéalé (114)
24. Soguinneu (250)
25. Téapleu (7,740)
26. Tieupleu (1,013)
27. Tiévopleu 1 (617)
28. Tiévopleu 2 (690)
29. Trodapleu (208)
30. Vatouo (898)
31. Vétouo (2,146)
32. Zéalé (5,008)
33. Zohouéleu (1,331)
