= Totrodrou =

- Town and sub-prefecture
- Location in Ivory Coast
- Coordinates: 7°17′N 7°23′W
- Country: Ivory Coast
- District: Montagnes
- Region: Guémon
- Department: Kouibly

Population (2014)
  - Total: 13,403
- Time zone: UTC+0 (GMT)

Totrodrou is a town in western Ivory Coast. It is a sub-prefecture of Kouibly Department in Guémon Region, Montagnes District.

Totrodrou was a commune until March 2012, when it became one of 1,126 communes nationwide that were abolished.

In 2014, the population of the sub-prefecture of Totrodrou was 13,403.

== Villages ==
The eleven villages of the sub-prefecture of Totrodrou and their population in 2014 are:

1. Baou 1 (1,184)
2. Béoué 2 (724)
3. Datouzon (1,254)
4. Guinglo-Ville (937)
5. Guinglo-Zia (319)
6. Guézon-Kirou (540)
7. Kordrou (2,297)
8. Nénady-Kirou (1,377)
9. Nénady-Tébao 1 (1,201)
10. Totodrou (2,101)
11. Touandrou-Kirou (1,469)
