= Zagoué =

- Town and sub-prefecture
- Location in Ivory Coast
- Coordinates: 7°29′N 7°30′W
- Country: Ivory Coast
- District: Montagnes
- Region: Tonkpi
- Department: Man

Population (2014)
  - Total: 5,410
- Time zone: UTC+0 (GMT)

Zagoué is a town in western Ivory Coast. It is a sub-prefecture of Man Department in Tonkpi Region, Montagnes District.

Zagoué was a commune until March 2012, when it became one of 1,126 communes nationwide that were abolished.

In 2014, the population of the sub-prefecture of Zagoué was 5,410.

== Villages ==
The seven villages of the sub-prefecture of Zagoué and their population in 2014 are:

1. Déoulé (1,332)
2. Gboanlé (133)
3. Gboapeuloulé (624)
4. Glégouin (295)
5. Gouétimba (1,222)
6. Singouin (558)
7. Zagoué (1,246)
