= Fagnampleu =

Fagnampleu Fényampleu
- Town and sub-prefecture
- Location in Ivory Coast
- Coordinates: 7°27′N 7°24′W
- Country: Ivory Coast
- District: Montagnes
- Region: Tonkpi
- Department: Man

Population (2014)
  - Total: 2,967
- Time zone: UTC+0 (GMT)

Fagnampleu (also spelled Fényampleu) is a town in western Ivory Coast. It is a sub-prefecture of Man Department in Tonkpi Region, Montagnes District.

Fagnampleu was a commune until March 2012, when it became one of 1,126 communes nationwide that were abolished.

In 2014, the population of the sub-prefecture of Fagnampleu was 2,967.

== Villages ==
The four villages of the sub-prefecture of Fagnampleu and their population in 2014 are:

1. Douagouin (458)
2. Gangbapleu (373)
3. Glayogouin (435)
4. Fagnampleu (1,701)
