= Bogouiné =

- Town and sub-prefecture
- Location in Ivory Coast
- Coordinates: 7°15′N 7°36′W
- Country: Ivory Coast
- District: Montagnes
- Region: Tonkpi
- Department: Man

Population (2014)
  - Total: 15,172
- Time zone: UTC+0 (GMT)

Bogouiné is a town in western Ivory Coast. It is a sub-prefecture of Man Department in Tonkpi Region, Montagnes District.

Bogouiné was a commune until March 2012, when it became one of 1,126 communes nationwide that were abolished.

In 2014, the population of the sub-prefecture of Bogouiné was 15,172.

== Villages ==
The fifteen villages of the sub-prefecture of Bogouiné and their population in 2014 are:

1. Bélé (805)
2. Bogouiné (2,469)
3. Doyagouiné (688)
4. Gbalépleu (229)
5. Glégouiné (638)
6. Glolé (947)
7. Golé (1,176)
8. Gongouiné 2 (1,217)
9. Gongouiné 3 (640)
10. Gouégolé (1,131)
11. Gouékangouiné (3,276)
12. Guingouiné (336)
13. Lékpèpleu (693)
14. Napodiagouiné (668)
15. Ziongouin (259)
