= Blapleu =

Blapleu Bafléso
- Town and sub-prefecture
- Location in Ivory Coast
- Coordinates: 7°38′N 7°44′W
- Country: Ivory Coast
- District: Montagnes
- Region: Tonkpi
- Department: Biankouma

Population (2014)
  - Total: 14,750
- Time zone: UTC+0 (GMT)

Blapleu (also known as Bafléso) is a town in western Ivory Coast. It is a sub-prefecture of Biankouma Department in Tonkpi Region, Montagnes District.

Blapleu was a commune until March 2012, when it became one of 1,126 communes nationwide that were abolished.

In 2014, the population of the sub-prefecture of Blapleu was 14,750.

== Villages ==
The seven villages of the sub-prefecture of Blapleu and their population in 2014 are:

1. Blapleu (5,420)
2. Gama (2,422)
3. Gbéné (790)
4. Gouélé (1,499)
5. Guégouin (344)
6. Klapleu (2,103)
7. Zantongouin (2,172)
