= Podiagouiné =

- Town and sub-prefecture
- Location in Ivory Coast
- Coordinates: 7°9′N 7°45′W
- Country: Ivory Coast
- District: Montagnes
- Region: Tonkpi
- Department: Man

Population (2014)
  - Total: 21,694
- Time zone: UTC+0 (GMT)

Podiagouiné is a town in western Ivory Coast. It is a sub-prefecture of Man Department in Tonkpi Region, Montagnes District.

Podiagouiné was a commune until March 2012, when it became one of 1,126 communes nationwide that were abolished.

In 2014, the population of the sub-prefecture of Podiagouiné was 21,694.

== Villages ==
The fifteen villages of the sub-prefecture of Podiagouiné and their population in 2014 are:

1. Biongouiné (1,141)
2. Bogouiné (743)
3. Dainé 1 (3,402)
4. Dolé (95)
5. Douleu (2,258)
6. Gbangbégouiné (773)
7. Gbèpleu (403)
8. Gloleu (5,019)
9. Gotongouiné Blouno (544)
10. Lonlé (79)
11. Nionlé-Gouépleu (2,114)
12. Nionlé-Kpampoupleu (1,771)
13. Oulaï Yaopleu (670)
14. Podiagouiné (2,194)
15. Vagouiné (488)
