= Santa, Montagnes =

Santa
- Town and sub-prefecture
- Location in Ivory Coast
- Coordinates: 7°42′N 7°31′W
- Country: Ivory Coast
- District: Montagnes
- Region: Tonkpi
- Department: Biankouma

Population (2014)
  - Total: 27,225
- Time zone: UTC+0 (GMT)

Santa is a town in western Ivory Coast. It is a sub-prefecture of Biankouma Department in Tonkpi Region, Montagnes District.

Santa was a commune until March 2012, when it became one of 1,126 communes nationwide that were abolished.

In 2014, the population of the sub-prefecture of Santa was 27,225.

== Villages ==
The ten villages of the sub-prefecture of Santa and their population in 2014 are:

1. Blita (2,169)
2. Bounta (6,858)
3. Gbalé (1,858)
4. Goualé (758)
5. Guéoulé (4,234)
6. Kpogouin (1,551)
7. Santa (5,303)
8. Topkapleu (2,346)
9. Yimpouta (1,040)
10. Yonzonleu (1,108)
