= Koua, Ivory Coast =

Koua
- Town and sub-prefecture
- Location in Ivory Coast
- Coordinates: 7°30′N 7°16′W
- Country: Ivory Coast
- District: Montagnes
- Region: Guémon
- Department: Facobly

Population (2014)
  - Total: 8,515
- Time zone: UTC+0 (GMT)

Koua is a town in western Ivory Coast. It is a sub-prefecture of Facobly Department in Guémon Region, Montagnes District.

Koua was a commune until March 2012, when it became one of 1,126 communes nationwide that were abolished.

In 2014, the population of the sub-prefecture of Koua was 8,515.

== Villages ==
The four villages of the sub-prefecture of Koua and their population in 2014 are:

1. Flansobly (3,217)
2. Klangbolably (1,506)
3. Koua (1,890)
4. Tiébly (1,902)
