= Gbangbégouiné =

- Town and sub-prefecture
- Location in Ivory Coast
- Coordinates: 7°41′N 7°49′W
- Country: Ivory Coast
- District: Montagnes
- Region: Tonkpi
- Department: Biankouma

Population (2014)
  - Total: 3,449
- Time zone: UTC+0 (GMT)

Gbangbégouiné is a town in western Ivory Coast. It is a sub-prefecture of Biankouma Department in Tonkpi Region, Montagnes District.

Gbangbégouiné was a commune until March 2012, when it became one of 1,126 communes nationwide that were abolished.

In 2014, the population of the sub-prefecture of Gbangbégouiné was 3,449.

== Villages ==
The five villages of the sub-prefecture of Gbangbégouiné and their population in 2014 are:

1. Blégouin (680)
2. Ganlé 1 (297)
3. Ganlé 2 (1,254)
4. Gan-Santa (254)
5. Gbangbégouiné (964)
