= Banneu =

- Town and sub-prefecture
- Location in Ivory Coast
- Coordinates: 7°4′N 8°15′W
- Country: Ivory Coast
- District: Montagnes
- Region: Tonkpi
- Department: Zouan-Hounien

Population (2014)
  - Total: 13,223
- Time zone: UTC+0 (GMT)

Banneu is a town in the far west of Ivory Coast. It is a sub-prefecture of Zouan-Hounien Department in Tonkpi Region, Montagnes District.

Banneu was a commune until March 2012, when it became one of 1,126 communes nationwide that were abolished.

In 2014, the population of the sub-prefecture of Banneu was 13,223.

== Villages ==
The ten villages of the sub-prefecture of Banneu and their population in 2014 are:

1. Banneu (4,498)
2. Bianhitouo (1,397)
3. Gbouagleu (1,388)
4. Gningleu (1,064)
5. Ipouata (476)
6. Ligaleu 1 (1,037)
7. Ligaleu 2 (411)
8. Mouantouo (899)
9. Trogleu 1 (865)
10. Zongopleu (1,188)
