= Moyen-Cavally =

Coordinates: 6°25′N 7°30′W

Moyen-Cavally Region Région du Moyen-Cavally
- Defunct region of Ivory Coast
- 2000–2011
- Location of Moyen-Cavally Region in Ivory Coast
- Capital: Guiglo
- Area
- 14,268 km^{2} (5,509 sq mi)
- History
  - Established as a first-level subdivision via division of Dix-Huit Montagnes Region: 2000
  - Disestablished: 2011
- Today part of: Cavally (all) and Guémon (part) regions

Moyen-Cavally Region is a defunct region of Ivory Coast. From 2000 to 2011, it was a first-level subdivision region. The region's capital was Guiglo and its area was 14,268 km^{2}. Since 2011, the area formerly encompassed by the region is part of Montagnes District.

== Creation ==
Moyen-Cavally Region was created in 2000 by splitting-off Duékoué Department, Guiglo Department, and Toulépleu Department from Dix-Huit Montagnes Region.

== Administrative divisions ==
At the time of its dissolution, Moyen-Cavally Region was divided into four departments: Bloléquin, Duékoué, Guiglo, and Toulépleu.

== Abolition ==
Moyen-Cavally Region was abolished as part of the 2011 administrative reorganisation of the subdivisions of Ivory Coast. The area formerly encompassed by the region is now part of Montagnes District. The territory of the department of Duékoué was combined with the former Dix-Huit Montagnes Region's Bangolo and Kouibly Departments to create the new second-level Guémon Region. The territory of the remaining departments—Bloléquin, Guiglo, and Toulépleu—were combined to create Cavally Region, another region of the new Montagnes District.
