= Yorodougou =

Yorodougou Dioradougou
- Town and sub-prefecture
- Location in Ivory Coast
- Coordinates: 7°47′N 7°53′W
- Country: Ivory Coast
- District: Montagnes
- Region: Tonkpi
- Department: Sipilou

Population (2014)
  - Total: 19,451
- Time zone: UTC+0 (GMT)

Yorodougou (also spelled Dioradougou) is a town in the far west of Ivory Coast. It is a sub-prefecture of Sipilou Department in Tonkpi Region, Montagnes District.

Yorodougou was a commune until March 2012, when it became one of 1,126 communes nationwide that were abolished.

In 2014, the population of the sub-prefecture of Yorodougou was 19,451.

== Villages ==
The seven villages of the sub-prefecture of Yorodougou and their population in 2014 are:

1. Gangbapleu (5,248)
2. Gbagompleu (738)
3. Ouéma (1,389)
4. Samapleu (3,995)
5. Yépleu (2,503)
6. Yorodougou (4,626)
7. Zocoma (952)
