= Ziogouiné =

- Town and sub-prefecture
- Location in Ivory Coast
- Coordinates: 7°12′N 7°38′W
- Country: Ivory Coast
- District: Montagnes
- Region: Tonkpi
- Department: Man

Population (2014)
  - Total: 9,323
- Time zone: UTC+0 (GMT)

Ziogouiné is a town in western Ivory Coast. It is a sub-prefecture of Man Department in Tonkpi Region, Montagnes District.

Ziogouiné was a commune until March 2012, when it became one of 1,126 communes nationwide that were abolished.

In 2014, the population of the sub-prefecture of Ziogouiné was 9,323.

== Villages ==
The nine villages of the sub-prefecture of Ziogouiné and their population in 2014 are:

1. Diapleu (1,284)
2. Dioulé (810)
3. Gouégouiné (832)
4. Gouélé (1,184)
5. Kassiogouiné (532)
6. Lozonlé (422)
7. Tontigouiné (161)
8. Trinlé (825)
9. Ziogouiné (3,273)
