= Gbapleu =

- Town and sub-prefecture
- Location in Ivory Coast
- Coordinates: 6°29′N 7°10′W
- Country: Ivory Coast
- District: Montagnes
- Region: Guémon
- Department: Duékoué

Area
  - Total: 501 km^{2} (193 sq mi)

Population (2021 census)
  - Total: 60,833
  - Density: 121/km^{2} (314/sq mi)
  - Town: 22,219
- (2014 census)
- Time zone: UTC+0 (GMT)

Gbapleau is a town in western Ivory Coast. It is a sub-prefecture of Duékoué Department in Guémon Region, Montagnes District.

Gbapleu was a commune until March 2012, when it became one of 1,126 communes nationwide that were abolished.

In 2021, the population of the sub-prefecture of Gbapleu was 60,833.

== Villages ==
The seven villages of the sub-prefecture of Gbapleu and their population in 2014 are:

1. Fouedougou (12,760)
2. Gbapleu (22,219)
3. Kéïtadougou (2,261)
4. Krazandougou (12,817)
5. Ouattaradougou (12,880)
6. Sioville (1,158)
7. Telably (2,454)
