= Moussa Sanoh =

Liberian footballer

Personal information
- Date of birth: 20 July 1995 (age 31)
- Place of birth: Gbapleu, Ivory Coast
- Height: 5 ft 8 1/2 in (1.74 m)
- Position: Winger

Team information
- Current team: Phichit United
- Number: 34

Youth career
- Quick 1888
- –2009: NEC
- 2009–2014: PSV

Senior career*
Years	Team	Apps	(Gls)
2014–2016	Jong PSV	46	(4)
2016–2017	RKC Waalwijk	40	(5)
2017–2018	Crawley Town	12	(0)
2018–2019	Politehnica Iași	27	(5)
2019–2020	Gaz Metan Mediaș	11	(0)
2020	→ Voluntari (loan)	16	(1)
2021	Balzan	6	(2)
2021–2022	Mioveni	30	(4)
2022–2023	Eindhoven	11	(1)
2023–2024	Ayutthaya United	34	(6)
2024–2025	Police Tero	13	(0)
2025	Bonnyrigg White Eagles	9	(2)
2025–	Phichit United	11	(4)

International career^{‡}
2013	Netherlands U17	5	(1)
2013–2014	Netherlands U19	6	(0)
2021–	Liberia	6	(0)
- * Club domestic league appearances and goals as of 29 April 2026 ‡ National team caps and goals as of 00:49, 14 November 2021 (UTC)

Moussa Sanoh (born 20 July 1995) is a professional footballer who plays as a winger for Thai League 3 club Phichit United. Born in the Ivory Coast to Liberian and Guinean parents, and raised in the Netherlands, Sanoh represents the Liberia national team.

== Club career ==
=== Jong PSV ===
Sanoh joined PSV in 2009, and made his Jong PSV debut in March 2014, in their 2–1 away victory against FC Eindhoven, replacing Aleksandar Boljević in the 90th minute. On 2 December 2014, Sanoh scored his first goal for Jong PSV in their 3–1 home win against De Graafschap, sealing the hosts' victory in the 93rd minute.

=== RKC Waalwijk ===
In order to find first-team football, Sanoh joined fellow Eerste Divisie side RKC Waalwijk in January 2016 on a six-month deal. Three days later, Sanoh made his RKC Waalwijk debut in their 3–1 defeat against Almere City, featuring for the entire 90 minutes. Following an impressive first few months at the club, Sanoh signed a new one-year deal prior to the 2016–17 campaign. He went onto score his first goal for RKC in their 3–1 away victory over Jong Utrecht, netting in the 71st minute after replacing Fred Benson. Sanoh went onto net four more times before leaving the Dutch side in June 2017.

=== Crawley Town ===
On 5 June 2017, Sanoh agreed to join English side Crawley Town on a two-year deal with the option of an extra year. On 8 August 2017, Sanoh made his Crawley debut during their EFL Cup first round 5–1 defeat against Championship side Birmingham City. A month later, he made his league debut in their 1–0 home defeat against Notts County, replacing Dannie Bulman in the 68th minute. Sanoh scored his first goal for Crawley in their 3–1 away defeat against Portsmouth in an EFL Trophy group stage tie. On 3 July 2018, it was announced that Sanoh would leave Crawley, following a mutual termination in his contract.

=== Later years ===
On 5 July 2018, following his release from Crawley, Sanoh joined Romanian side Politehnica Iași on a two-year deal.

On 1 July 2019, Sanoh joined Romanian club Gaz Metan Mediaș.

On 12 January 2020, Sanoh joined Liga I club Voluntari on loan until the end of the 2019–20 season. His contract with Gaz Metan Mediaș was terminated at the end of December 2020.

In January 2021, Sanoh continued his career with Balzan of the Maltese Premier League.

On 10 August 2021, Sanoh signed a one-year contract with newly promoted Romanian Liga I club Mioveni, with an option for an additional year.

Sanoh returned to the Netherlands on 24 June 2022, signing a one-year contract with Eindhoven with an option for an additional year.

== International career ==
Sanoh was born in Gbapleu, Ivory Coast, and raised in Nijmegen, Netherlands, by a father of Liberian descent and a mother of Guinean descent. Once eligible to represent Ivory Coast, Liberia, or Guinea at international level, he featured for the Netherlands under-17 and under-19 sides between 2013 and 2014 before switching to represent Liberia at senior level.

On 2 October 2021, he accepted a call-up from Liberia for two World Cup qualifiers against Cape Verde. He made his senior debut for Liberia in a 2–1 2022 FIFA World Cup qualification loss to Cape Verde on 7 October 2021.

== Career statistics ==
As of match played 12 May 2024

Appearances and goals by club, season and competition
Club	Season	League			National cup		League cup		Other		Total	
Club	Season	Division	Apps	Goals	Apps	Goals	Apps	Goals	Apps	Goals	Apps	Goals
Jong PSV	2013–14	Eerste Divisie	1	0	—		—		—		1	0
Jong PSV	2014–15	Eerste Divisie	32	2	—		—		—		32	2
Jong PSV	2015–16	Eerste Divisie	13	2	—		—		—		13	2
Jong PSV	Total		46	4	—		—		—		46	4
RKC Waalwijk	2015–16	Eerste Divisie	14	0	0	0	—		—		14	0
RKC Waalwijk	2016–17	Eerste Divisie	26	5	2	0	—		0	0	28	5
RKC Waalwijk	Total		40	5	2	0	—		0	0	42	5
Crawley Town	2017–18	League Two	12	0	0	0	1	0	3 (Note: Appearance(s) in EFL Trophy)	1	16	1
Politehnica Iași	2018–19	Liga I	27	5	1	1	—		—		28	6
Gaz Metan Mediaș	2019–20	Liga I	6	0	0	0	—		—		6	0
Gaz Metan Mediaș	2020–21	Liga I	5	0	0	0	—		—		5	0
Gaz Metan Mediaș	Total		11	0	0	0	—		—		11	0
Voluntari (loan)	2019–20	Liga I	16	1	0	0	—		—		16	1
Balzan	2020–21	Maltese Premier League	6	2	0	0	—		—		6	2
Mioveni	2021–22	Liga I	30	4	1	0	—		—		31	4
Eindhoven	2022–23	Eerste Divisie	1	0	0	0	—		—		1	0
Ayutthaya United	2023–24	Thai League 2	32	6	—		—		2 (Note: Appearance(s) in Thai League 2 Play-offs)	0	34	6
Police Tero	2024–25	Thai League 2	–	–	–	–	–	–	—		–	–
Career total			221	27	4	1	1	0	5	1	231	29
