= Facobly =

Facobly Facobli
- Town, sub-prefecture, and commune
- Location in Ivory Coast
- Coordinates: 7°23′N 7°23′W
- Country: Ivory Coast
- District: Montagnes
- Region: Guémon
- Department: Facobly

Population (2014)
  - Total: 22,407
- Time zone: UTC+0 (GMT)

Facobly (also spelled Facobli) is a town in western Ivory Coast. It is a sub-prefecture of and seat of Facobly Department in Guémon Region, Montagnes District. Facobly is also a commune.

In 2014, the population of the sub-prefecture of Facobly was 22,407.

== Villages ==
The seventeen villages of the sub-prefecture of Facobly and their population in 2014 are:

1. Douimbly (856)
2. Facobly (4,536)
3. Gbodrou (616)
4. Kaokossably (935)
5. Kiriao (2,600)
6. Koléa (819)
7. Kontrou (1,381)
8. Kébly (703)
9. Mangboébly (811)
10. Mayébly (1,009)
11. Souébly (1,572)
12. Takouaébly (871)
13. Tiessan (1,159)
14. Tiédrou (1,243)
15. Téïsson (939)
16. Zouatta 1 (949)
17. Zouatta 2 (1,408)

== Notable people ==
- Serey Dié (born 7 November 1984), Ivorian international footballer
