= Bagohouo =

- Town and sub-prefecture
- Location in Ivory Coast
- Coordinates: 6°53′N 7°12′W
- Country: Ivory Coast
- District: Montagnes
- Region: Guémon
- Department: Duékoué

Population (2014)
  - Total: 46,129
- Time zone: UTC+0 (GMT)

Bagohouo is a town in western Ivory Coast. It is a sub-prefecture of Duékoué Department in Guémon Region, Montagnes District.

Bagohouo was a commune until March 2012, when it became one of 1,126 communes nationwide that were abolished.

In 2014, the population of the sub-prefecture of Bagohouo was 46,129.

== Villages ==
The 11 villages of the sub-prefecture of Bagohouo and their population in 2014 are:

1. Bagohouo (10,369)
2. Bohoussoukro (3,852)
3. Guinglo-Zia (4,823)
4. Kouassikro (833)
5. Lédjéhan (5,757)
6. Nidrou (5,616)
7. Okakro 1 (830)
8. Okakro 2 (1,086)
9. Pona-Vahi (4,886)
10. Sibably (3,592)
11. Yrozon (4,485)
