= Semien =

Semien is Amharic and Tigrinya for "north", and may refer to:

- Semien Mountains
- Semien province
- Kingdom of Semien, a historical political entity of the Beta Israel people

== People ==
- Marcus Semien, American baseball player
- Prince Semien Fielder, American baseball player
- Robyn Semien, American TV and radio producer

== See also ==
- Sémien, a town in Ivory Coast
