= Sangouiné =

- Town, sub-prefecture, and commune
- Location in Ivory Coast
- Coordinates: 7°16′N 7°47′W
- Country: Ivory Coast
- District: Montagnes
- Region: Tonkpi
- Department: Man

Population (2014)
  - Total: 36,832
- Time zone: UTC+0 (GMT)

Sangouiné is a town in western Ivory Coast. It is a sub-prefecture and commune of Man Department in Tonkpi Region, Montagnes District.

In 2014, the population of the sub-prefecture of Sangouiné was 36,832.

== Villages ==
The twenty four villages of the sub-prefecture of Sangouiné and their population in 2014 are:

1. Bloleu (1 432)
2. Diokagouiné (545)
3. Glolé 1 (359)
4. Glolé 2 (604)
5. Goba (400)
6. Gotongouiné 1 (3 247)
7. Gotongouiné 2 (1 031)
8. Gouagonopleu (1 024)
9. Kassiapleu (448)
10. Lagoulalé (922)
11. Mélagouiné (1 184)
12. Oulaï Glèpleu (954)
13. Saguipleu (1 540)
14. Sangouiné (7 956)
15. Zoba (1 610)
16. Zonlé 2 (2 204)
17. Drangouiné (1 864)
18. Gbagbepleu (404)
19. Kpampleu (432)
20. Kpanblèpleu (3 079)
21. Kpanzaopleu (1 753)
22. Ligbalé 1 (1 400)
23. Ligbalé 2 (1 872)
24. Tiapleu (568)
