= Ouyably-Gnondrou =

- Town and sub-prefecture
- Location in Ivory Coast
- Coordinates: 7°20′N 7°12′W
- Country: Ivory Coast
- District: Montagnes
- Region: Guémon
- Department: Kouibly

Population (2014)
  - Total: 49,470
- Time zone: UTC+0 (GMT)

Ouyably-Gnondrou is a town in western Ivory Coast. It is a sub-prefecture of Kouibly Department in Guémon Region, Montagnes District.

The town has a multi-purpose centre, housing educational and health facilities, social and cultural centres, as well as meeting places for the community. Construction of the centre was funded by the Western Union Helping Hands initiative.

Ouyably-Gnondrou was a commune until March 2012, when it became one of 1,126 communes nationwide that were abolished.

In 2014, the population of the sub-prefecture of Ouyably-Gnondrou was 49,470.

== Villages ==
The twelve villages of the sub-prefecture of Ouyably-Gnondrou and their population in 2014 are:

1. Douagué (9,274)
2. Gbéibly (760)
3. Koulayéré (1,450)
4. Makaïbly (2,917)
5. Ouyably-Gnondrou (6,921)
6. Pagnébly (4,004)
7. Piébly 1 (3,922)
8. Piébly 2 (2,491)
9. Pombly (7,025)
10. Taobly (7,675)
11. Tuéwo (845)
12. Wonséa (2,186)
