= Guézon, Duékoué =

Guézon
- Town and sub-prefecture
- Location in Ivory Coast
- Coordinates: 6°44′N 7°7′W
- Country: Ivory Coast
- District: Montagnes
- Region: Guémon
- Department: Duékoué

Area
  - Total: 724 km^{2} (280 sq mi)

Population (2021 census)
  - Total: 56,435
  - Density: 77.9/km^{2} (202/sq mi)
  - Town: 15,473
- (2014 census)
- Time zone: UTC+0 (GMT)

Guézon is a town in western Ivory Coast. It is a sub-prefecture of Duékoué Department in Guémon Region, Montagnes District.

Guézon was a commune until March 2012, when it became one of 1,126 communes nationwide that were abolished.

In 2021, the population of the sub-prefecture of Guézon was 56,435.

== Villages ==
The eleven villages of the sub-prefecture of Guézon and their population in 2014 are:

1. Dibobli (7,926)
2. Gahably (863)
3. Gréikro (3,863)
4. Guessabo-Guéré (2,087)
5. Guézon (15,473)
6. Konédougou (652)
7. Nanady (7,331)
8. Pona-Ouinlo (2,171)
9. Tahably-Glodéhé (4,430)
10. Tien-Oula (2,845)
11. Tobly-Bangolo (10,552)
