= Logoualé =

- Town, sub-prefecture, and commune
- Location in Ivory Coast
- Coordinates: 7°7′N 7°33′W
- Country: Ivory Coast
- District: Montagnes
- Region: Tonkpi
- Department: Man

Area
  - Total: 200 km^{2} (77 sq mi)

Population (2021 census)
  - Total: 32,854
  - Density: 160/km^{2} (430/sq mi)
  - Town: 12,425
- (2014 census)
- Time zone: UTC+0 (GMT)

Logoualé is a town in western Ivory Coast. It is a sub-prefecture and commune of Man Department in Tonkpi Region, Montagnes District.

In 2021, the population of the sub-prefecture of Logoualé was 32,854.

== Villages ==
The fifteen villages of the sub-prefecture of Logoualé and their population in 2014 are:

1. Banlé (918)
2. Dakoupleu (3 213)
3. Dinégouiné (560)
4. Diouziamba (475)
5. Gblonlé (904)
6. Goziogouiné 1 (975)
7. Goziogouiné 2 (484)
8. Kétongouiné (410)
9. Koulinlé (923)
10. Logoualé (12 425)
11. Douélé (1 582)
12. Gbé-Tontigouiné (966)
13. Gloalé (2 691)
14. Kpoagouiné (486)
15. Soapleu - Dazeré (1 496)

== 2005 Lougouale Attack ==
On Feb. 28, 2005, the village was attacked during the First Ivorian Civil War by pro-government militias. The French army estimated forty to fifty were killed in the attack, mostly militiamen, while the UN placed the death toll at twenty eight. Eighty seven militiamen were captured by Bangladeshi peacekeeping troops in the days following the attack.

The attack flamed intercommunal tensions in the following weeks, leading to dozens of deaths and 13 000 people being internally displaced.
