= Sémien =

- Town and sub-prefecture
- Location in Ivory Coast
- Coordinates: 7°37′N 7°8′W
- Country: Ivory Coast
- District: Montagnes
- Region: Guémon
- Department: Facobly

Population (2014)
  - Total: 28,812
- Time zone: UTC+0 (GMT)

Sémien is a town in western Ivory Coast. It is a sub-prefecture of Facobly Department in Guémon Region, Montagnes District.

Sémien was a commune until March 2012, when it became one of 1,126 communes nationwide that were abolished.

In 2014, the population of the sub-prefecture of Sémien was 28,812.

== Villages ==
The five villages of the sub-prefecture of Sémien and their population in 2014 are:

1. Bibita (1,724)
2. Kanébly (7,365)
3. Sémien (10,617)
4. Siambly (3,736)
5. Taobly (5,370)
