= Sandougou-Soba =

- Town and sub-prefecture
- Location in Ivory Coast
- Coordinates: 7°36′N 7°29′W
- Country: Ivory Coast
- District: Montagnes
- Region: Tonkpi
- Department: Man

Population (2014)
  - Total: 7,746
- Time zone: UTC+0 (GMT)

Sandougou-Soba is a town in western Ivory Coast. It is a sub-prefecture of Man Department in Tonkpi Region, Montagnes District.

Sandougou-Soba was a commune until March 2012, when it became one of 1,126 communes nationwide that were abolished.

In 2014, the population of the sub-prefecture of Sandougou-Soba was 7,746.

== Villages ==
The fifteen villages of the sub-prefecture of Sandougou-Soba and their population in 2014 are:

1. Bassatima (1,084)
2. Beta (283)
3. Bofesso-Douma (240)
4. Bofesso-Sama (1,136)
5. Douodié (327)
6. Gbata (545)
7. Gbatodié (332)
8. Gotondié (89)
9. Kpassagodié (205)
10. Sandougou-Soba (1,916)
11. Sokourala (717)
12. Tegouin (246)
13. Yorogouélé (207)
14. Zangouin (155)
15. Zérégbadié (264)
