= Guéhiébly =

Guéhiébly Guéhiébli
- Town and sub-prefecture
- Location in Ivory Coast
- Coordinates: 6°54′N 7°26′W
- Country: Ivory Coast
- District: Montagnes
- Region: Guémon
- Department: Duékoué

Population (2014)
  - Total: 51,933
- Time zone: UTC+0 (GMT)

Guéhiébly (also spelled Guéhiébli) is a town in western Ivory Coast. It is a sub-prefecture of Duékoué Department in Guémon Region, Montagnes District.

Guéhiébly was a commune until March 2012, when it became one of 1,126 communes nationwide that were abolished.

In 2014, the population of the sub-prefecture of Guéhiébly was 51,933.

== Villages ==
The eight villages of the sub-prefecture of Guéhiébly and their population in 2014 are:

1. Bahé-Sébon (12,011)
2. Delobly (2,255)
3. Diéhiba (11,767)
4. Diourouzon (12,857)
5. Gozon (3,551)
6. Guéhiébly (5,018)
7. Guinglo-Sropan (2,509)
8. Séhoun-Guiglo (1,965)
