= Kouibly =

Kouibly Kouibli
- Town, sub-prefecture, and commune
- Location in Ivory Coast
- Coordinates: 7°15′N 7°14′W
- Country: Ivory Coast
- District: Montagnes
- Region: Guémon
- Department: Kouibly

Population (2014)
  - Total: 43,392
- Time zone: UTC+0 (GMT)

Kouibly (also spelled Kouibli) is a town in western Ivory Coast. It is a sub-prefecture of and the seat of Kouibly Department in Guémon Region, Montagnes District. Kouibly is also a commune.

In 2014, the population of the sub-prefecture of Kouibly was 43,392.

== Villages ==
The seventeen villages of the sub-prefecture of Kouibly and their population in 2014 are:

1. Batiébly (1 942)
2. Bouébly (1 167)
3. Diébambobly (1 673)
4. Gnoahé (1 547)
5. Kouibly (11 830)
6. Séably (1 992)
7. Siébly (2 135)
8. Tacourably (7 838)
9. Tobly (981)
10. Trodrou (1 522)
11. Guézon-Gbéan 1 (655)
12. Guézon-Gbéan 2 (922)
13. Guinglo-Gbéan (1 478)
14. Kéiténably (4 100)
15. Kéklobly (601)
16. Kessably (1 176)
17. Touandrou-Gbéan (1 833)
