= Zouan-Hounien =

- Town, sub-prefecture, and commune
- Location in Ivory Coast
- Coordinates: 6°55′N 8°13′W
- Country: Ivory Coast
- District: Montagnes
- Region: Tonkpi
- Department: Zouan-Hounien

Area
  - Total: 441 km^{2} (170 sq mi)

Population (2021 census)
  - Total: 111,099
  - Density: 252/km^{2} (652/sq mi)
  - Town: 22,872
- (2014 census)
- Time zone: UTC+0 (GMT)

Zouan-Hounien is a town in the far west of Ivory Coast. It is a sub-prefecture of and the seat of Zouan-Hounien Department in Tonkpi Region, Montagnes District. Zouan-Hounien is also a commune.

In 2021, the population of the sub-prefecture of Zouan-Hounien was 111,099.

== Villages ==
The fifty one villages of the sub-prefecture of Zouan-Hounien and their population in 2014 are:

1. Banhiéleu (879)
2. Bèpleu 1 (829)
3. Biantouo 1 (1 884)
4. Biantouo 2 (2 866)
5. Blontouo (192)
6. Bouèneu (2 366)
7. Boupleu 1 (509)
8. Boutouo 1 (997)
9. Deinneu (2 093)
10. Douèleu (496)
11. Douoleu (863)
12. Gbatéagbeupleu (756)
13. Gbatta (900)
14. Gbèleu (111)
15. Gbontégleu (508)
16. Gnonleu-Peusseutouo (651)
17. Gouin-Houyé (683)
18. Ity (1 231)
19. Kamimpleu (570)
20. Kan-Houyé (831)
21. Kouépleu (2 149)
22. Kouyatouo 1 (554)
23. Kpantouopleu (1 255)
24. Lavampleu (609)
25. Méantouo (2 848)
26. Pépleu 1 (745)
27. Pépleu 2 (603)
28. Trogleu 2 (1 041)
29. Yaopleu (313)
30. Zinampleu (472)
31. Zouan-Hounien (22 872)
32. Banyouépleu (333)
33. Bieutouo (2 310)
34. Floleu (7 685)
35. Gbloleu (865)
36. Glangleu (1 867)
37. Gloleu (255)
38. Gnaleu (1 112)
39. Gningleu (991)
40. Guéiyaopleu (620)
41. Guizreu 1 (980)
42. Kouyaguiépleu (1 275)
43. Kpangbalapleu (378)
44. Krozialé (2 125)
45. Manhampleu (593)
46. Natta-Dosseupleu (737)
47. Niamampleu (1 170)
48. Ouyatouo (1 824)
49. Zeulipleu (306)
50. Zoutouo (2 450)
51. Zoutouo-Darra (882)
