= Goulaleu =

- Town and sub-prefecture
- Location in Ivory Coast
- Coordinates: 6°42′N 8°22′W
- Country: Ivory Coast
- District: Montagnes
- Region: Tonkpi
- Department: Zouan-Hounien

Population (2014)
  - Total: 20,479
- Time zone: UTC+0 (GMT)

Goulaleu is a town in the far west of Ivory Coast. It is a sub-prefecture of Zouan-Hounien Department in Tonkpi Region, Montagnes District. The town is five kilometres east of the border with Liberia.

Goulaleu was a commune until March 2012, when it became one of 1,126 communes nationwide that were abolished.

In 2014, the population of the sub-prefecture of Goulaleu was 20,479.

== Villages ==
The twenty four villages of the sub-prefecture of Goulaleu and their population in 2014 are:

1. Dohoupleu (1,024)
2. Douéleu (572)
3. Féapleu (173)
4. Ganleu (622)
5. Gbampleu (777)
6. Glareu (875)
7. Glèpleu (2,061)
8. Gliouleu (840)
9. Gouantouo (721)
10. Goulaleu (1,969)
11. Gouopleu (625)
12. Gueidépleu (550)
13. Guiamapleu (2,370)
14. Kéatouo (675)
15. Koleu (140)
16. Kplanleu (571)
17. Manpleu (424)
18. Méapleu (755)
19. Séipleu (1,313)
20. Souapleu 1 (700)
21. Tapleu (990)
22. Yéipleu (392)
23. Yomipleu (542)
24. Zéitouo (798)
