= Gbonné =

- Town, sub-prefecture, and commune
- Location in Ivory Coast
- Coordinates: 7°32′N 7°25′W
- Country: Ivory Coast
- District: Montagnes
- Region: Tonkpi
- Department: Biankouma

Population (2014)
  - Total: 35,957
- Time zone: UTC+0 (GMT)

Gbonné is a town in western Ivory Coast. It is a sub-prefecture and commune of Biankouma Department in Tonkpi Region, Montagnes District.

In 2014, the population of the sub-prefecture of Gbonné was 35,957.

== Villages ==
The twenty five villages of the sub-prefecture of Gbonné and their population in 2014 are:

1. Diané (1 002)
2. Dozéré (420)
3. Gaolé-Graba 1 (609)
4. Gaolé-Graba 2 (577)
5. Gbonné (3 306)
6. Gouétomba (365)
7. Kprogouélé (774)
8. Monguilé (549)
9. Ouétomba (356)
10. Ouroné (1 241)
11. Yorogoué (456)
12. Douaguéré (783)
13. Douéné (1 034)
14. Gandié (843)
15. Ganné (1 306)
16. Gninglé (1 719)
17. Gouétidié (313)
18. Gourané (7 737)
19. Gouréné (751)
20. Kamahi (517)
21. Koulikoro (3 345)
22. Lotou (163)
23. Nané (3 919)
24. Zouandié (2 260)
25. Zorolé (1 612)
