= Sipilou Department =

Coordinates: 7°52′N 8°6′W

Sipilou Department Département de Sipilou
- Department
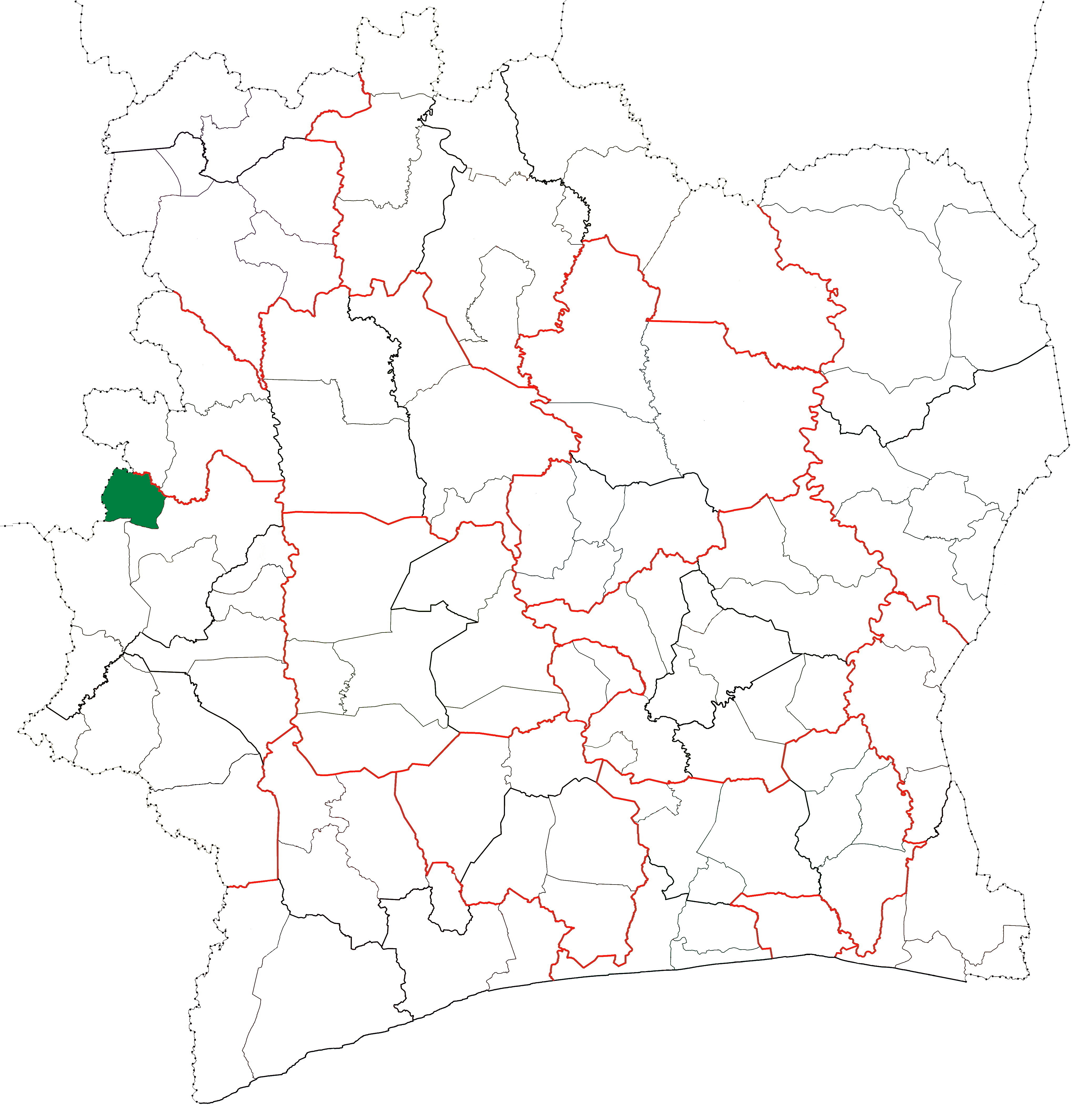
- Location in Ivory Coast. Sipilou Department has retained the same boundaries since its creation in 2012.
- Country: Ivory Coast
- District: Montagnes
- Region: Tonkpi
- 2012: Established via a division of Biankouma Dept
- Departmental seat: Sipilou

Government
  - Prefect: Florentin Assamoi

Area
  - Total: 1,090 km^{2} (420 sq mi)

Population (2021 census)
  - Total: 73,109
  - Density: 67.1/km^{2} (174/sq mi)
- Time zone: UTC+0 (GMT)

Sipilou Department is a department of Tonkpi Region in Montagnes District, Ivory Coast. In 2021, its population was 73,109 and its seat is the settlement of Sipilou. The sub-prefectures of the department are Sipilou and Yorodougou.

== History ==
Sipilou Department was created in 2012 by dividing Biankouma Department.
