= Duékoué =

- City, sub-prefecture, and commune
- Location in Ivory Coast
- Coordinates: 6°44′N 7°21′W
- Country: Ivory Coast
- District: Montagnes
- Region: Guémon
- Department: Duékoué

Area
  - Total: 827 km^{2} (319 sq mi)

Population (2021 census)
  - Total: 220,953
  - Density: 267/km^{2} (692/sq mi)
  - City: 90,274
- (2014 census)
- Time zone: UTC+0 (GMT)

Duékoué (French: [dwekwe]) is a city in western Ivory Coast. It is a sub-prefecture of and the seat of Duékoué Department. It is also the seat of Guémon Region in Montagnes District and a commune. In the 2021 census, the population of the sub-prefecture of Duékoué was 220,953.

== History ==
At least 800 people were killed in Duékoué on 29 March 2011 due to fierce fighting during the 2010–11 Ivorian crisis.

== Climate ==
The Köppen-Geiger climate classification system classifies its climate as tropical wet and dry (Aw).

Climate data for Duékoué
Month	Jan	Feb	Mar	Apr	May	Jun	Jul	Aug	Sep	Oct	Nov	Dec	Year
Mean daily maximum °C (°F)	33.2 (91.8)	33.5 (92.3)	33.1 (91.6)	32.5 (90.5)	31.8 (89.2)	29.9 (85.8)	28.2 (82.8)	28 (82)	29.2 (84.6)	30.3 (86.5)	31.4 (88.5)	31.8 (89.2)	31.1 (87.9)
Daily mean °C (°F)	25.9 (78.6)	26.9 (80.4)	27.1 (80.8)	26.9 (80.4)	26.6 (79.9)	25.4 (77.7)	24.1 (75.4)	24 (75)	24.8 (76.6)	25.4 (77.7)	25.8 (78.4)	25.3 (77.5)	25.7 (78.2)
Mean daily minimum °C (°F)	18.6 (65.5)	20.3 (68.5)	21.1 (70.0)	21.4 (70.5)	21.5 (70.7)	21 (70)	20.1 (68.2)	20.1 (68.2)	20.5 (68.9)	20.5 (68.9)	20.3 (68.5)	18.9 (66.0)	20.4 (68.7)
Average precipitation mm (inches)	14 (0.6)	55 (2.2)	103 (4.1)	132 (5.2)	149 (5.9)	207 (8.1)	125 (4.9)	181 (7.1)	290 (11.4)	177 (7.0)	56 (2.2)	17 (0.7)	1,506 (59.4)
Source: Climate-Data.org (altitude: 231m)

== Villages ==
The sixteen villages of the sub-prefecture of Duékoué and their population in 2014 are:

1. Bahé-Blahon (13 281)
2. Baouli (4 574)
3. Blody (7 324)
4. Dahoua (3 857)
5. Duekoué (90 274)
6. Fengolo (28 670)
7. Guitrozon (7 202)
8. Niambly (3 664)
9. Pinhou (2 509)
10. Toa-Zéo (5 278)
11. Belemoin (1 010)
12. Diahouin (2 387)
13. Doumbiadougou (6 631)
14. Glaou (3 592)
15. Lokosso (4 355)
16. Tissongnénin (736)
