= Facobly Department =

Coordinates: 7°23′N 7°23′W

Facobly Department Département de Facobly
- Department
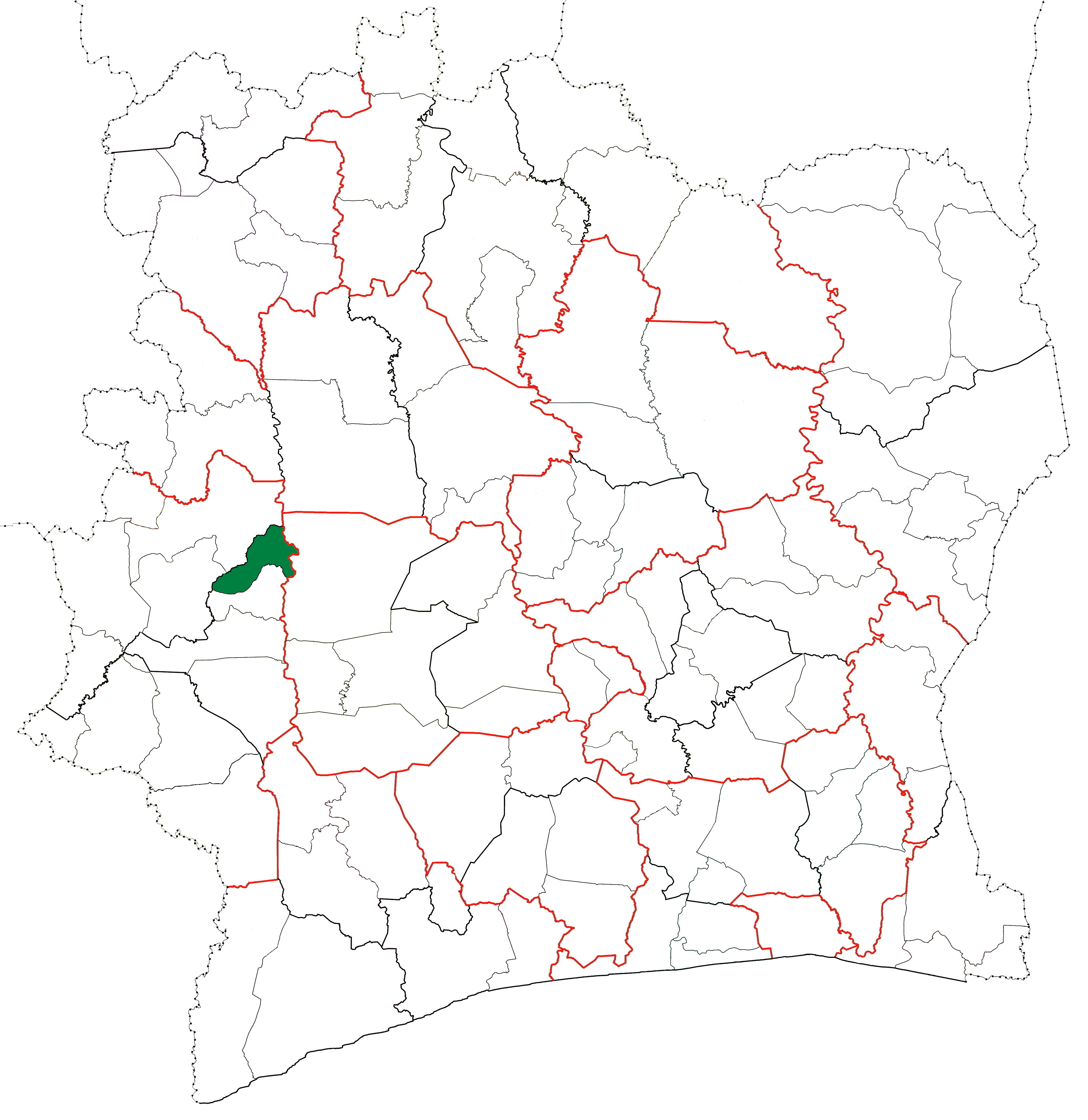
- Location in Ivory Coast. Facobly Department has retained the same boundaries since its creation in 2012.
- Country: Ivory Coast
- District: Montagnes
- Region: Guémon
- 2012: Established via a division of Kouibly Dept
- Departmental seat: Facobly

Government
  - Prefect: Mori Doumbia

Area
  - Total: 1,050 km^{2} (410 sq mi)

Population (2021 census)
  - Total: 94,610
  - Density: 90.1/km^{2} (233/sq mi)
- Time zone: UTC+0 (GMT)

Facobly Department is a department of Guémon Region in Montagnes District, Ivory Coast. In 2021, its population was 94,610 and its seat is the settlement of Facobly. The sub-prefectures of the department are Facobly, Guézon, Koua, Sémien, and Tiény-Séably.

== History ==
Facobly Department was created in 2012 by dividing Kouibly Department.
