= Zouan-Hounien Department =

Coordinates: 6°55′N 8°13′W

Zouan-Hounien Department Département de Zouan-Hounien
- Department
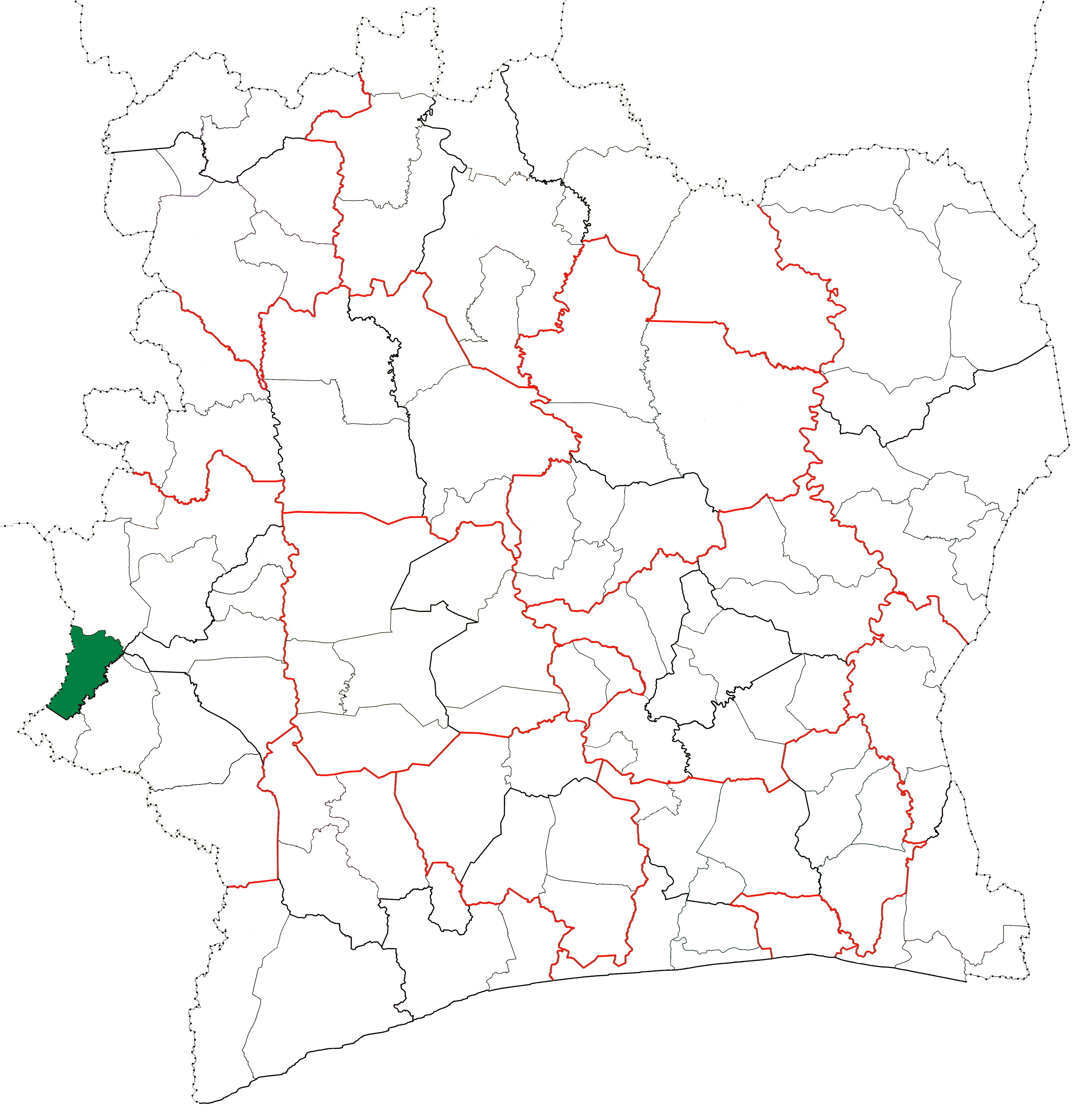
- Location in Ivory Coast. Zouan-Hounien Department has retained the same boundaries since its creation in 2005.
- Country: Ivory Coast
- District: Montagnes
- Region: Tonkpi
- 2005: Established as a second-level subdivision via a division of Danané Dept
- 2011: Converted to a third-level subdivision
- Departmental seat: Zouan-Hounien

Government
  - Prefect: Lancina Fofana

Area
  - Total: 1,370 km^{2} (530 sq mi)

Population (2021 census)
  - Total: 250,938
  - Density: 183/km^{2} (474/sq mi)
- Time zone: UTC+0 (GMT)

Zouan-Hounien Department is a department of Tonkpi Region in Montagnes District, Ivory Coast. In 2021, its population was 250,938 and its seat is the settlement of Zouan-Hounien. The sub-prefectures of the department are Banneu, Bin-Houyé, Goulaleu, Téapleu, Yelleu, and Zouan-Hounien.

== History ==
Zouan-Hounien Department was created in 2005 as a second-level subdivision via a split-off from Danané Department. At its creation, it was part of Dix-Huit Montagnes Region.

In 2011, districts were introduced as new first-level subdivisions of Ivory Coast. At the same time, regions were reorganised and became second-level subdivisions and all departments were converted into third-level subdivisions. At this time, Zouan-Hounien Department became part of Tonkpi Region in Montagnes District.
