= Man, Ivory Coast =

Man
- City, sub-prefecture, and commune
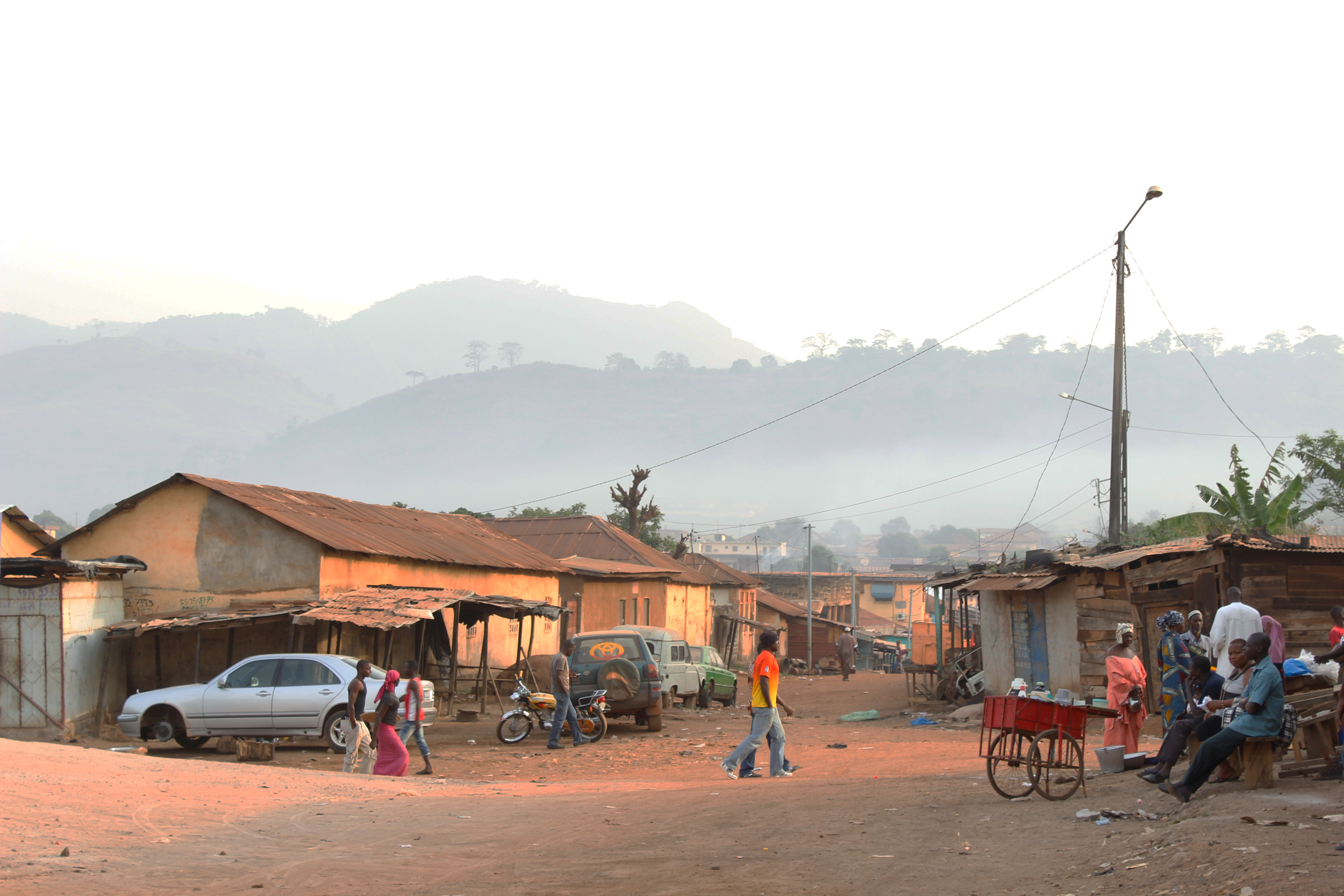
- Man city

- Location in Ivory Coast
- Coordinates: 7°24′N 7°33′W
- Country: Ivory Coast
- District: Montagnes
- Region: Tonkpi
- Department: Man

Area
  - Total: 471 km^{2} (182 sq mi)

Population (2021 census)
  - Total: 241,969
  - Density: 514/km^{2} (1,330/sq mi)
  - City: 149,041
- (2014 census)
- Time zone: UTC+0 (GMT)

Man is a city in western Ivory Coast. It is the seat of both Montagnes District and Tonkpi Region. It is also a commune and the seat of and a sub-prefecture of Man Department. In the 2014 census, the city had a population of 149,041, making it the eighth-largest city in the country.

== History ==
In November 2002, during conflict between government and rebel forces, the former rebel group Mouvement patriotique de Côte d'Ivoire (MPCI) held Man and the towns of Danané, Toulepleu, and Bloléquin.

== Geography ==
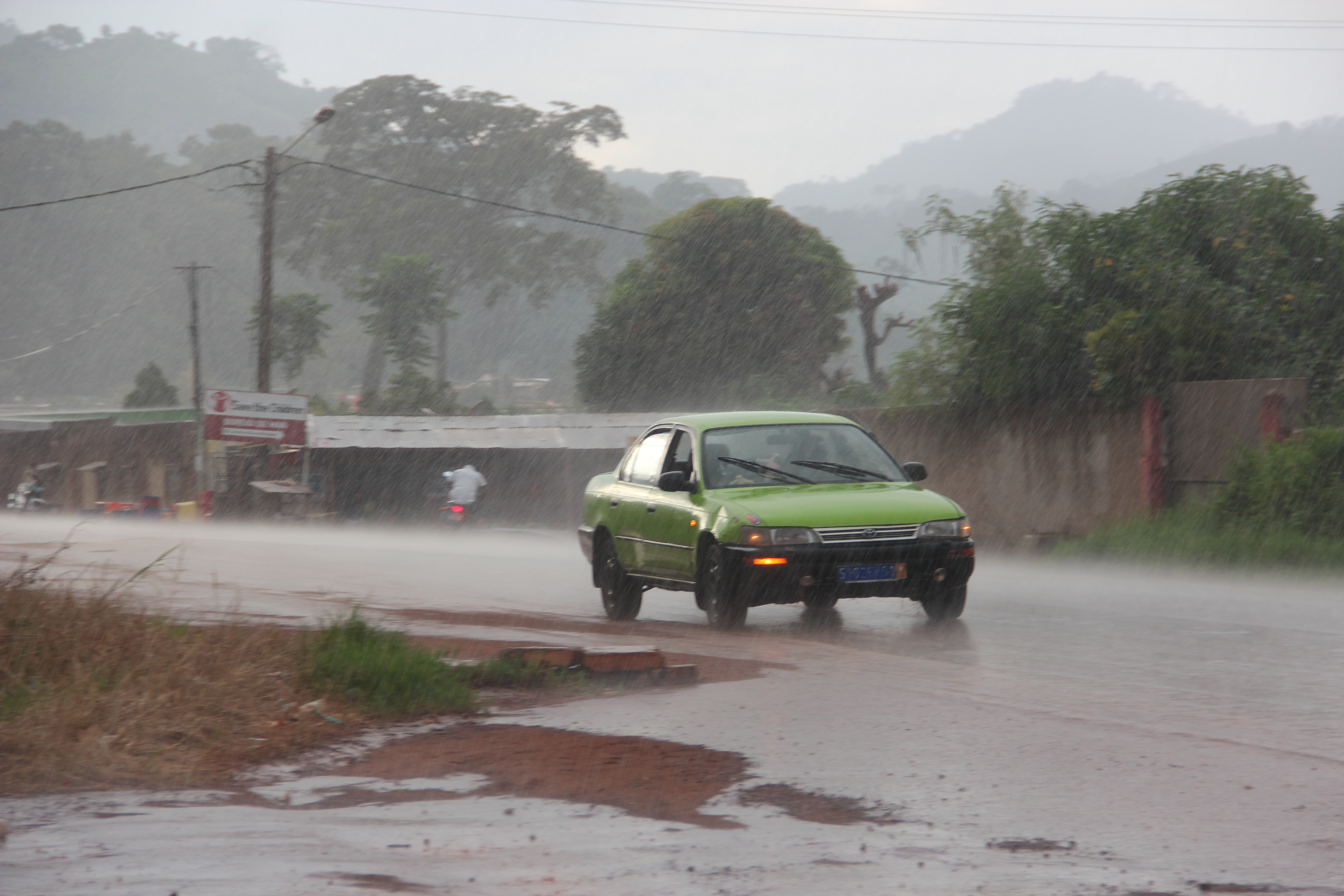
Heavy rain in June

Man is part of Montagnes District and is an important market town lying between mountains, including Mount Toura and Mount Tonkoui (the two highest in the nation), and La Dent de Man, popular with hikers and most recently, rock climbers.

== Climate ==
Man has a tropical savanna climate (Köppen Aw).

Climate data for Man, Ivory Coast
Month	Jan	Feb	Mar	Apr	May	Jun	Jul	Aug	Sep	Oct	Nov	Dec	Year
Mean daily maximum °C (°F)	32.4 (90.3)	33.5 (92.3)	33.0 (91.4)	31.9 (89.4)	30.9 (87.6)	29.3 (84.7)	27.8 (82.0)	27.6 (81.7)	28.8 (83.8)	29.8 (85.6)	30.3 (86.5)	30.6 (87.1)	30.5 (86.9)
Daily mean °C (°F)	23.7 (74.7)	25.8 (78.4)	26.7 (80.1)	26.4 (79.5)	26.0 (78.8)	25.0 (77.0)	24.0 (75.2)	24.0 (75.2)	24.6 (76.3)	25.0 (77.0)	24.9 (76.8)	23.5 (74.3)	25.0 (77.0)
Mean daily minimum °C (°F)	15.3 (59.5)	18.8 (65.8)	20.7 (69.3)	21.3 (70.3)	21.2 (70.2)	21.0 (69.8)	20.4 (68.7)	20.6 (69.1)	20.5 (68.9)	20.4 (68.7)	19.6 (67.3)	16.7 (62.1)	19.7 (67.5)
Average rainfall mm (inches)	10.8 (0.43)	43.4 (1.71)	109.3 (4.30)	152.8 (6.02)	147.5 (5.81)	183.7 (7.23)	185.6 (7.31)	273.6 (10.77)	285.0 (11.22)	134.5 (5.30)	42.1 (1.66)	19.5 (0.77)	1,587.8 (62.51)
Mean monthly sunshine hours	241.3	210.7	210.8	205.3	208.1	157.1	117.0	125.6	158.4	205.5	217.5	214.5	2,271.8
Source: NOAA

== Economy ==
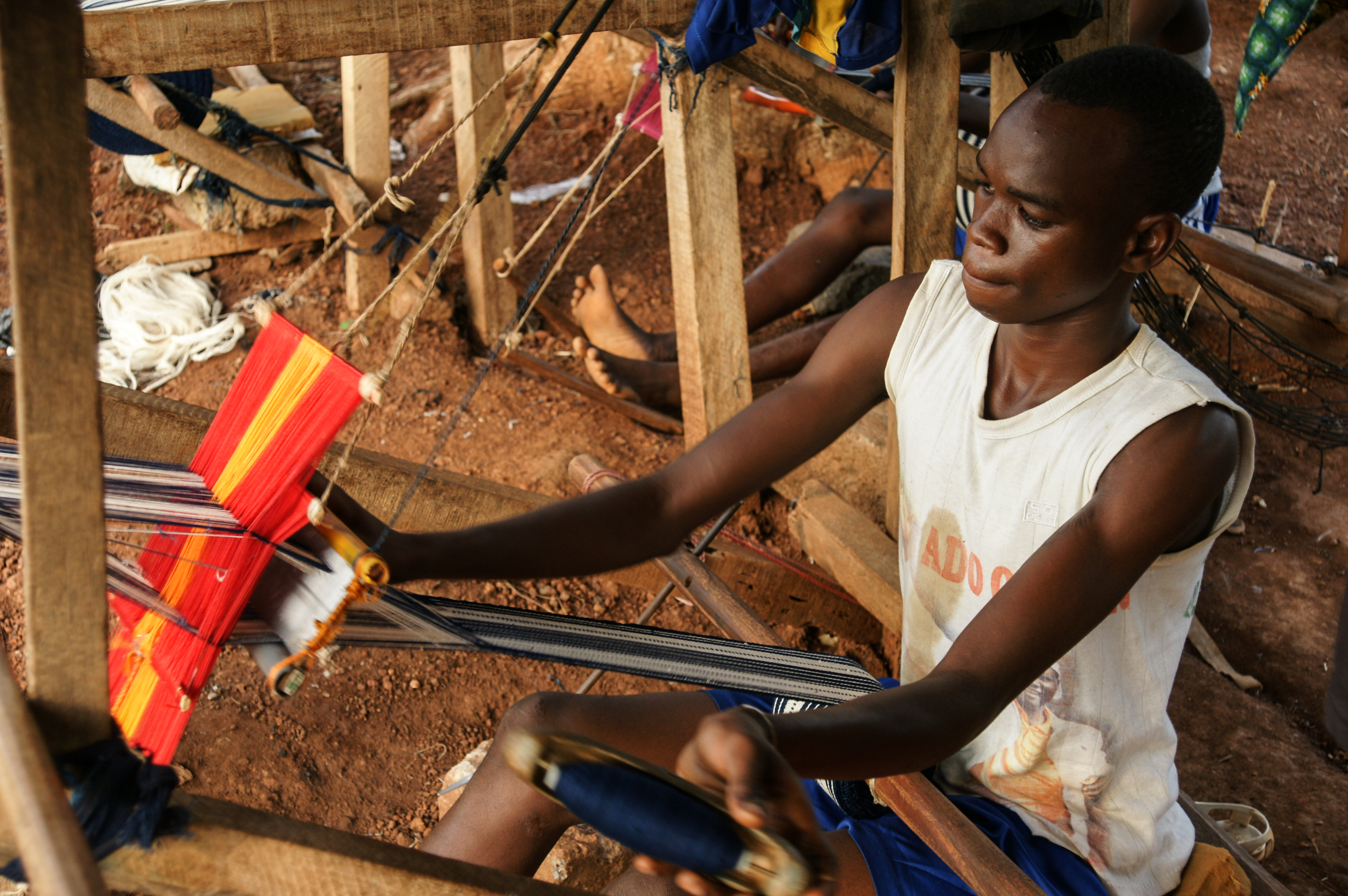
Weaving in Man

Man is an agricultural region, with many cocoa, rice, coffee, cassava, banana (plantain), and soybean plantations. The area is the largest producer of coffee in the Ivory Coast. It is the home of a UNICAFÉ (The National Coffee Manufacturer of Côte d'Ivoire) factory, and Nestlé operates several coffee plants in the area. The central market of Man buys and sells a large variety of fabrics (Yacouba traditional clothes, so-called Boubou Yacouba), and various Dan (Yacouba) masks.

There are a number of hotels, including "Hotel les Casacades", "Tanhotel", and "Hotel Beau Sejour", with facilities such as satellite TV, swimming pools and phone lines.

== Landmarks ==
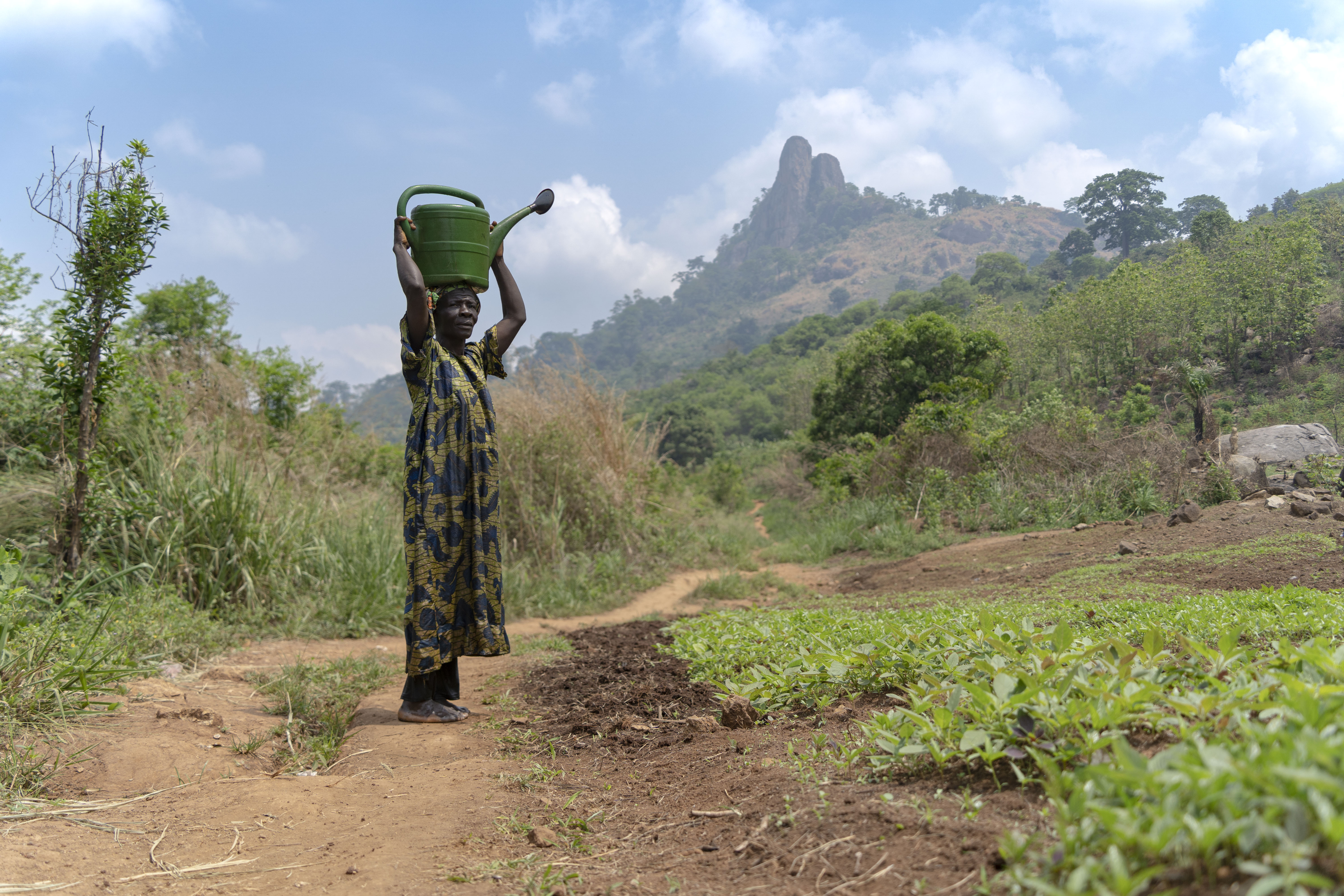
A woman carries water from the Dou River in a watering can to irrigate a vegetable garden at the foot of the Dent de Man mountain

The city is the home of the Roman Catholic Diocese of Man, with its cathedral at the Cathédrale Saint-Michel.

The main attractions around Man are La Cascade waterfall, a large rocky outcrop which overlooks the town known as the La Dent de Man (the tooth of Man), and the monkey forest. La Cascade waterfall is situated at the west side of the town, and is surrounded by a bamboo forest, which is the habitat of many colorful dragonflies and a wide variety of butterflies. The monkey forest is a wooded area in which monkeys live; for a small fee tourists can persuade local residents to call the monkeys out of their forest habitat.

== Villages ==
The twenty nine villages of the sub-prefecture of Man and their population in 2014 are:

1. Bantégouin (586)
2. Bigouin (1 091)
3. Blolé (2 784)
4. Botongouiné (1 131)
5. Dainé 2 (692)
6. Dompleu (2 622)
7. Gagouin (511)
8. Godégouin (569)
9. Gouakpalé (546)
10. Gouimpleu 1 (971)
11. Guianlé (1 421)
12. Kassiapleu (1 148)
13. Kpangouin 1 (1 018)
14. Kpangouin 2 (1 409)
15. Krikouma (1 205)
16. Man (148 945)
17. Petit Gbèpleu (648)
18. Seupleu (849)
19. Voungoué (1 764)
20. Yébégouin (324)
21. Zadépleu (463)
22. Zélé (3 042)
23. Biélé (1 533)
24. Gbatongouin (1 205)
25. Gueupleu (979)
26. Kiélé (2 918)
27. Lamapleu (1 132)
28. Oulédépleu (718)
29. Zérégouin (647)
