= Kouibly Department =

Coordinates: 7°15′N 7°14′W

Kouibly Department Département de Kouibly
- Department
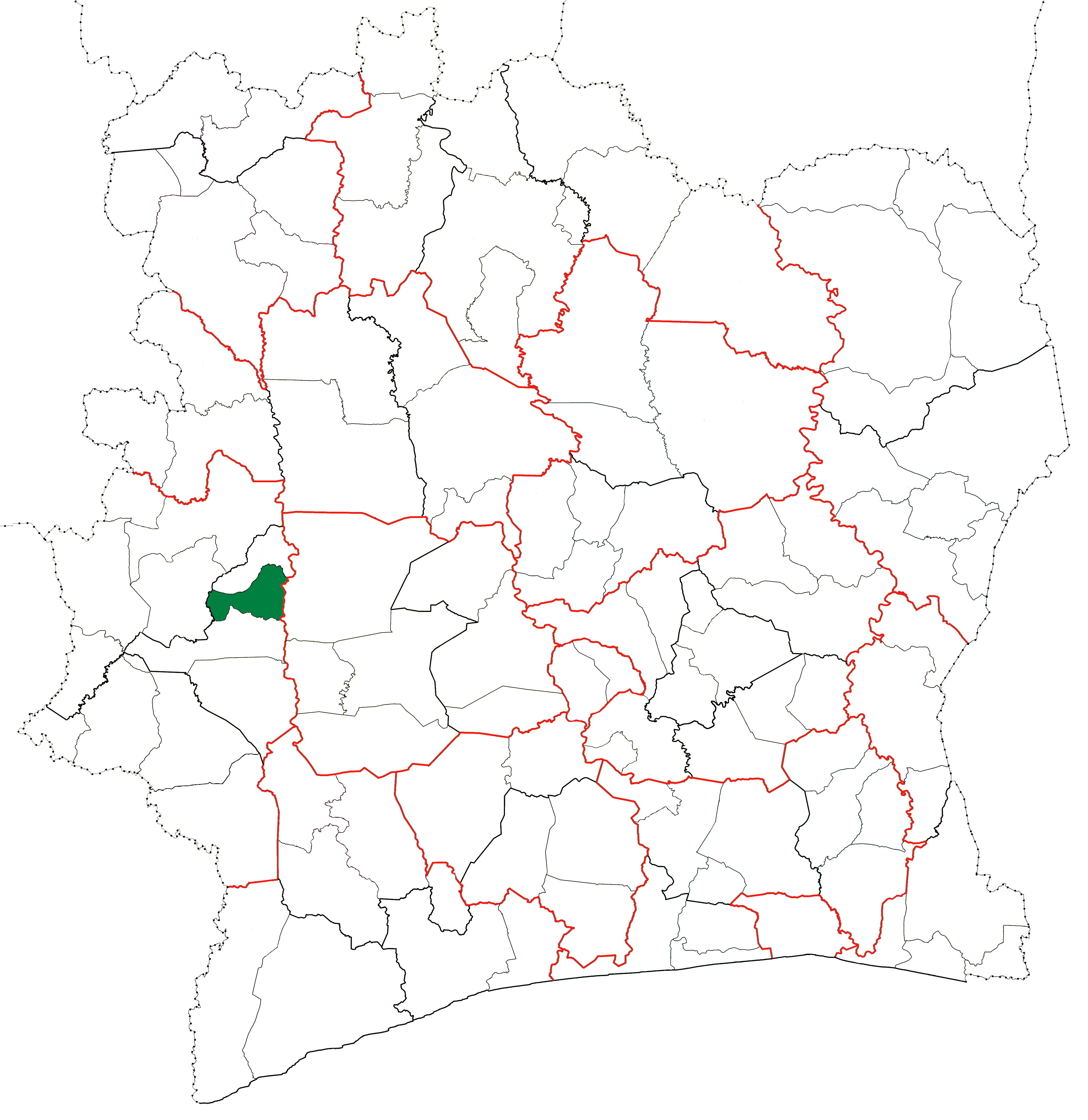
- Location in Ivory Coast. Kouibly Department has had these boundaries since 2012.
- Country: Ivory Coast
- District: Montagnes
- Region: Guémon
- 2005: Established as a second-level subdivision via a division of Man Dept
- 2011: Converted to a third-level subdivision
- 2012: Divided to create Facobly Dept
- Departmental seat: Kouibly

Government
  - Prefect: N'Dri Adolphe Yao

Area
  - Total: 1,020 km^{2} (390 sq mi)

Population (2021 census)
  - Total: 144,723
  - Density: 142/km^{2} (367/sq mi)
- Time zone: UTC+0 (GMT)

Kouibly Department is a department of Guémon Region in Montagnes District, Ivory Coast. In 2021, its population was 144,723 and its seat is the settlement of Kouibly. The sub-prefectures of the department are Kouibly, Nidrou, Ouyably-Gnondrou, and Totrodrou.

== History ==
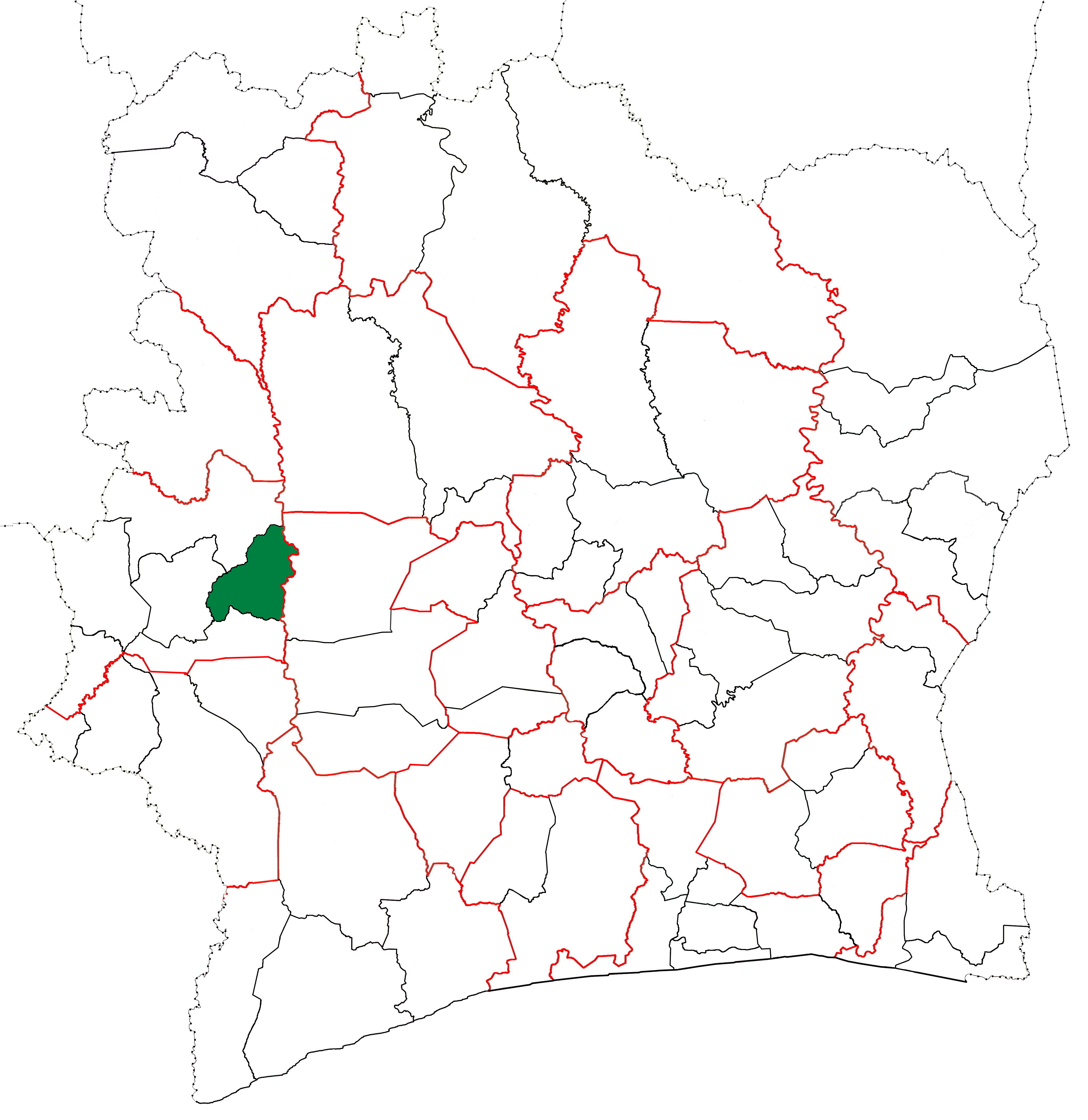
Kouibly Department upon its creation in 2005. It kept these boundaries until 2012, but other subdivision boundary changes began to be made in 2008.

Kouibly Department was created in 2005 as a second-level subdivision via a split-off from Man Department. At its creation, it was part of Dix-Huit Montagnes Region.

In 2011, districts were introduced as new first-level subdivisions of Ivory Coast. At the same time, regions were reorganised and became second-level subdivisions and all departments were converted into third-level subdivisions. At this time, Kouibly Department became part of Guémon Region in Montagnes District.

In 2012, five sub-prefectures were split-off from Kouibly Department to create Facobly Department.
