= Biankouma Department =

Coordinates: 7°44′N 7°37′W

Biankouma Department Département de Biankouma
- Department
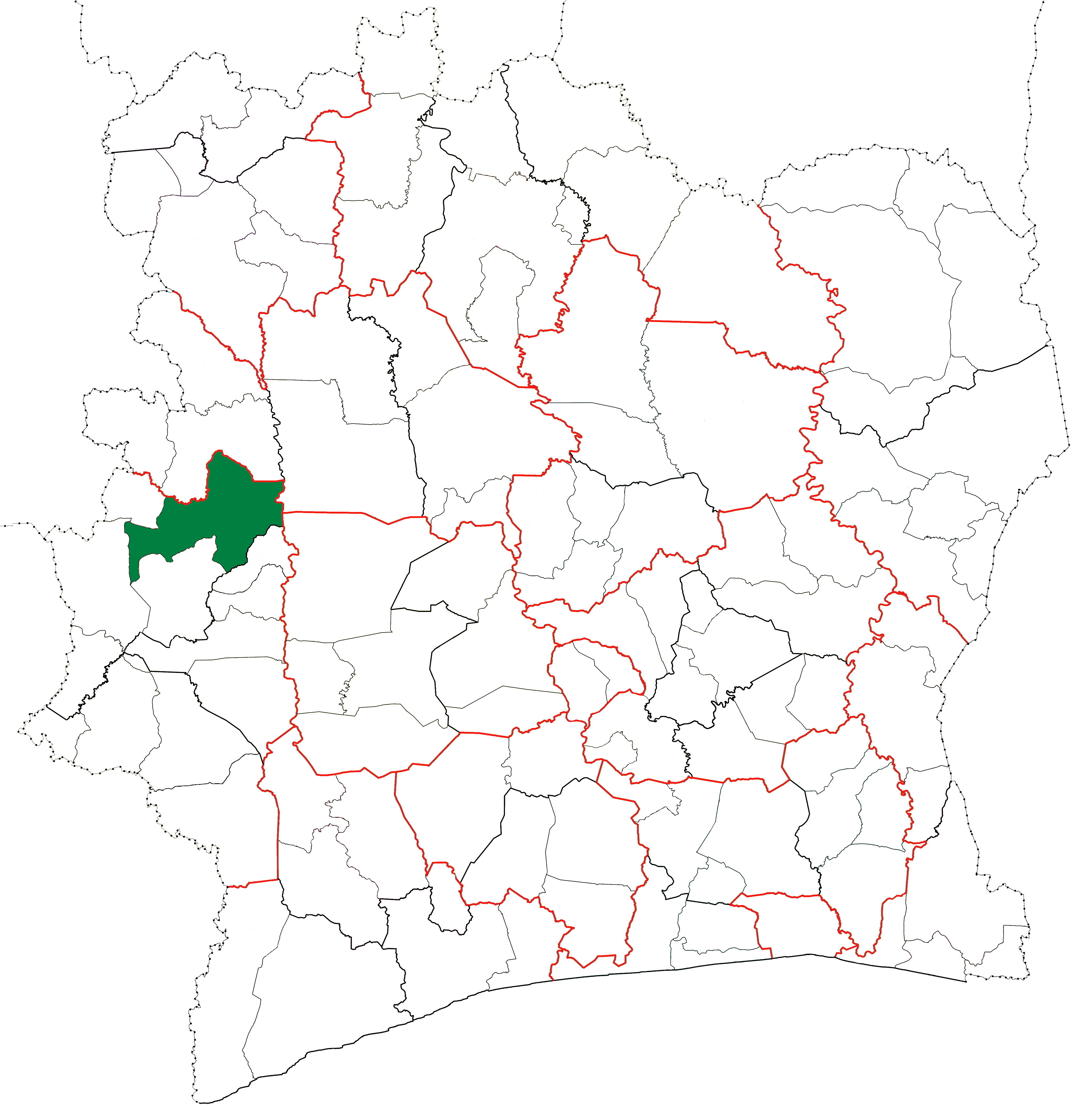
- Location in Ivory Coast. Biancouma Department has had these boundaries since 2012.
- Country: Ivory Coast
- District: Montagnes
- Region: Tonkpi
- 1969: Established as a first-level subdivision
- 1997: Converted to a second-level subdivision
- 2011: Converted to a third-level subdivision
- 2012: Divided to create Sipilou Dept
- Departmental seat: Biankouma

Government
  - Prefect: N'Guessan N'Dri

Area
  - Total: 3,900 km^{2} (1,500 sq mi)

Population (2021 census)
  - Total: 238,714
  - Density: 61/km^{2} (160/sq mi)
- Time zone: UTC+0 (GMT)

Biankouma Department is a department of Tonkpi Region in Montagnes District, Ivory Coast. In 2021, its population was 238,714 and its seat is the settlement of Biankouma. The sub-prefectures of the department are Biankouma, Blapleu, Gbangbégouiné, Gbonné, Gouiné, Kpata, and Santa.

== History ==
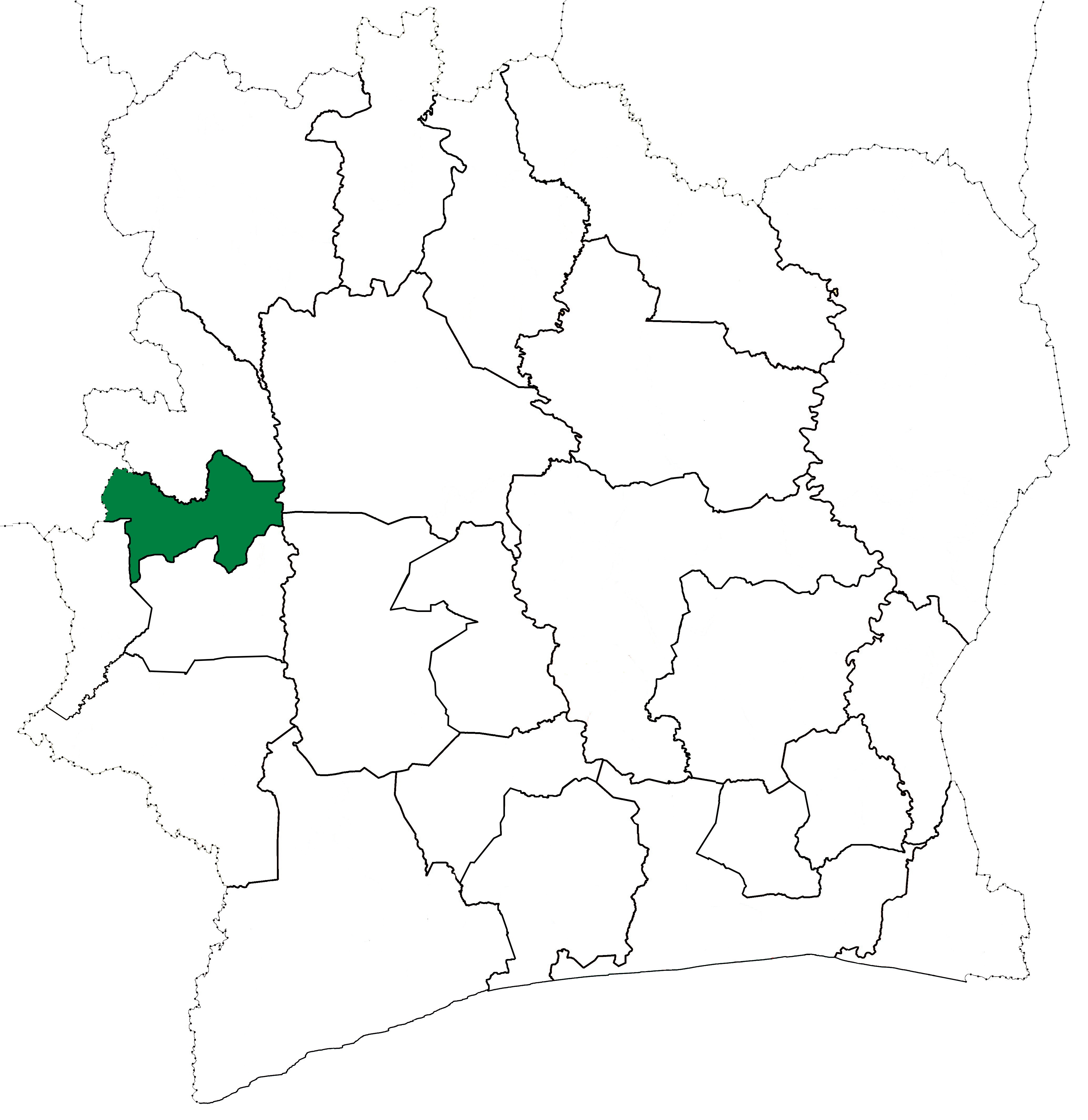
Biankouma Department upon its creation in 1969. It kept these boundaries until 2012, but other departments began to be divided in 1974.

Biankouma Department was created in 1969 as one of the 24 new departments that were created to take the place of the six departments that were being abolished. It was created from territory that was formerly part of Ouest Department.

In 1997, regions were introduced as new first-level subdivisions of Ivory Coast; as a result, all departments were converted into second-level subdivisions. Biankouma Department was included in Dix-Huit Montagnes Region.

In 2011, districts were introduced as new first-level subdivisions of Ivory Coast. At the same time, regions were reorganised and became second-level subdivisions and all departments were converted into third-level subdivisions. At this time, Biankouma Department became part of Tonkpi Region in Montagnes District.

The territory of Biankouma Department was unchanged until 2012, when two sub-prefectures were split-off to create Sipilou Department.
