= Man Department =

Coordinates: 7°24′N 7°33′W

Man Department Département de Man
- Department
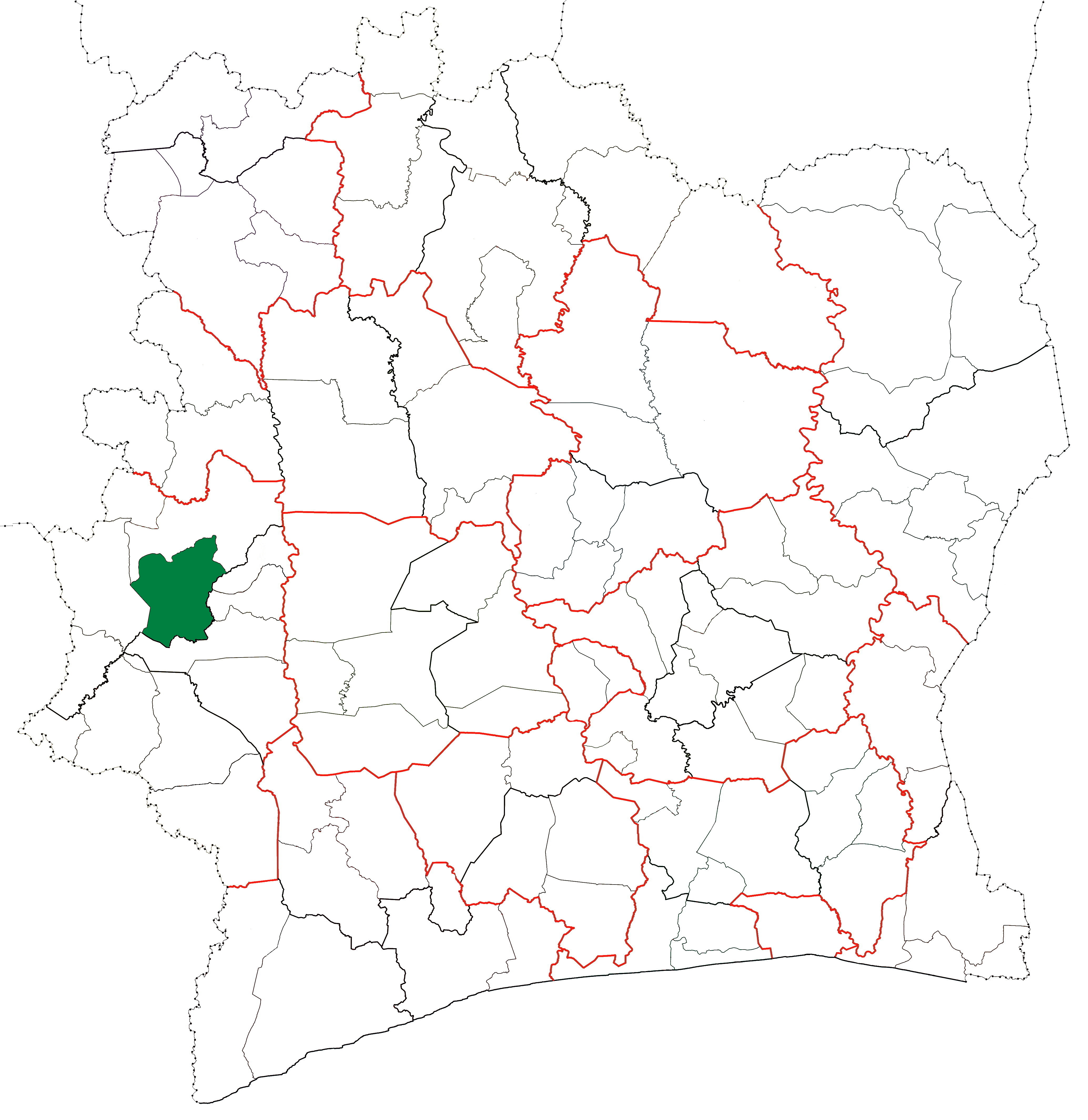
- Location in Ivory Coast. Man Department has had these boundaries since 2005.
- Country: Ivory Coast
- District: Montagnes
- Region: Tonkpi
- 1969: Established as a first-level subdivision
- 1988: Divided to create Bangolo Dept
- 1997: Converted to a second-level subdivision
- 2005: Divided to create Kouibly Dept
- 2011: Converted to a third-level subdivision
- Departmental seat: Man

Government
  - Prefect: Kayaha Jérôme Soro

Area
  - Total: 2,630 km^{2} (1,020 sq mi)

Population (2021 census)
  - Total: 461,135
  - Density: 175/km^{2} (454/sq mi)
- Time zone: UTC+0 (GMT)

Man Department is a department of Tonkpi Region in Montagnes District, Ivory Coast. In 2021, its population was 461,135 and its seat is the settlement of Man. The sub-prefectures of the department are Bogouiné, Fagnampleu, Gbangbégouiné-Yati, Logoualé, Man, Podiagouiné, Sandougou-Soba, Sangouiné, Yapleu, Zagoué, and Ziogouiné.

== History ==
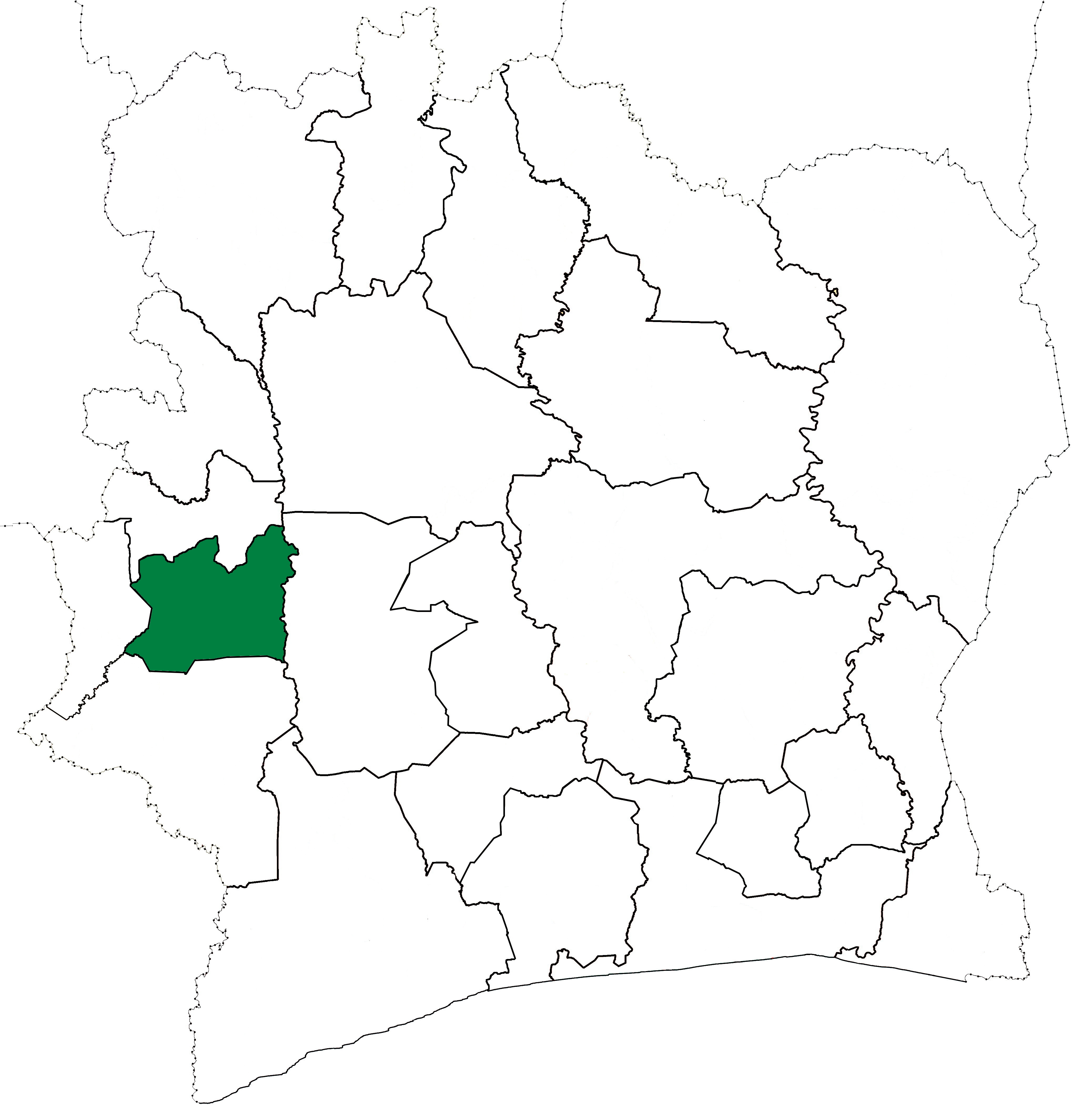
Man Department upon its creation in 1969. It kept these boundaries until 1988, but other departments began to be divided in 1974.

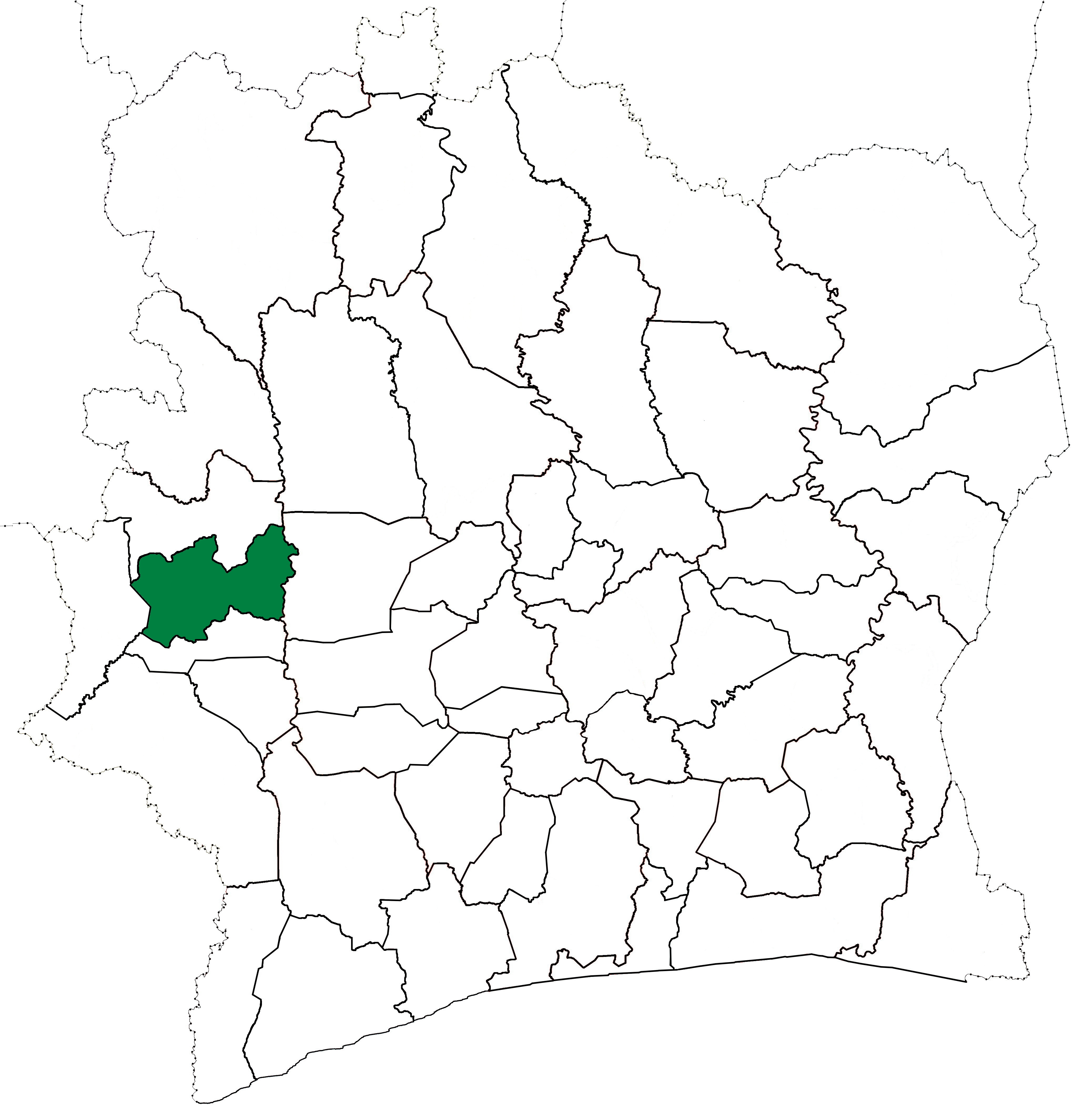
Man Department from 1988 to 2005. (Other subdivision boundaries began to change in 1995.)

Man Department was created in 1969 as one of the 24 new departments that were created to take the place of the six departments that were being abolished. It was created from territory that was formerly part of Ouest Department. Using current boundaries as a reference, from 1969 to 1988 the department occupied the following territory: all of Guémon Region, with the exception of Duékoué Department; plus the present-day Man Department.

In 1988, Man Department was split to create Bangolo Department. In 1997, regions were introduced as new first-level subdivisions of Ivory Coast; as a result, all departments were converted into second-level subdivisions. Man Department was included as part of Dix-Huit Montagnes Region.

Man Department was split again in 2005 in order to create Kouibly Department.

In 2011, districts were introduced as new first-level subdivisions of Ivory Coast. At the same time, regions were reorganised and became second-level subdivisions and all departments were converted into third-level subdivisions. At this time, Man Department became part of Tonkpi Region in Montagnes District.
