= Duékoué Department =

Coordinates: 6°44′N 7°21′W

Duékoué Department Département de Duékoué
- Department
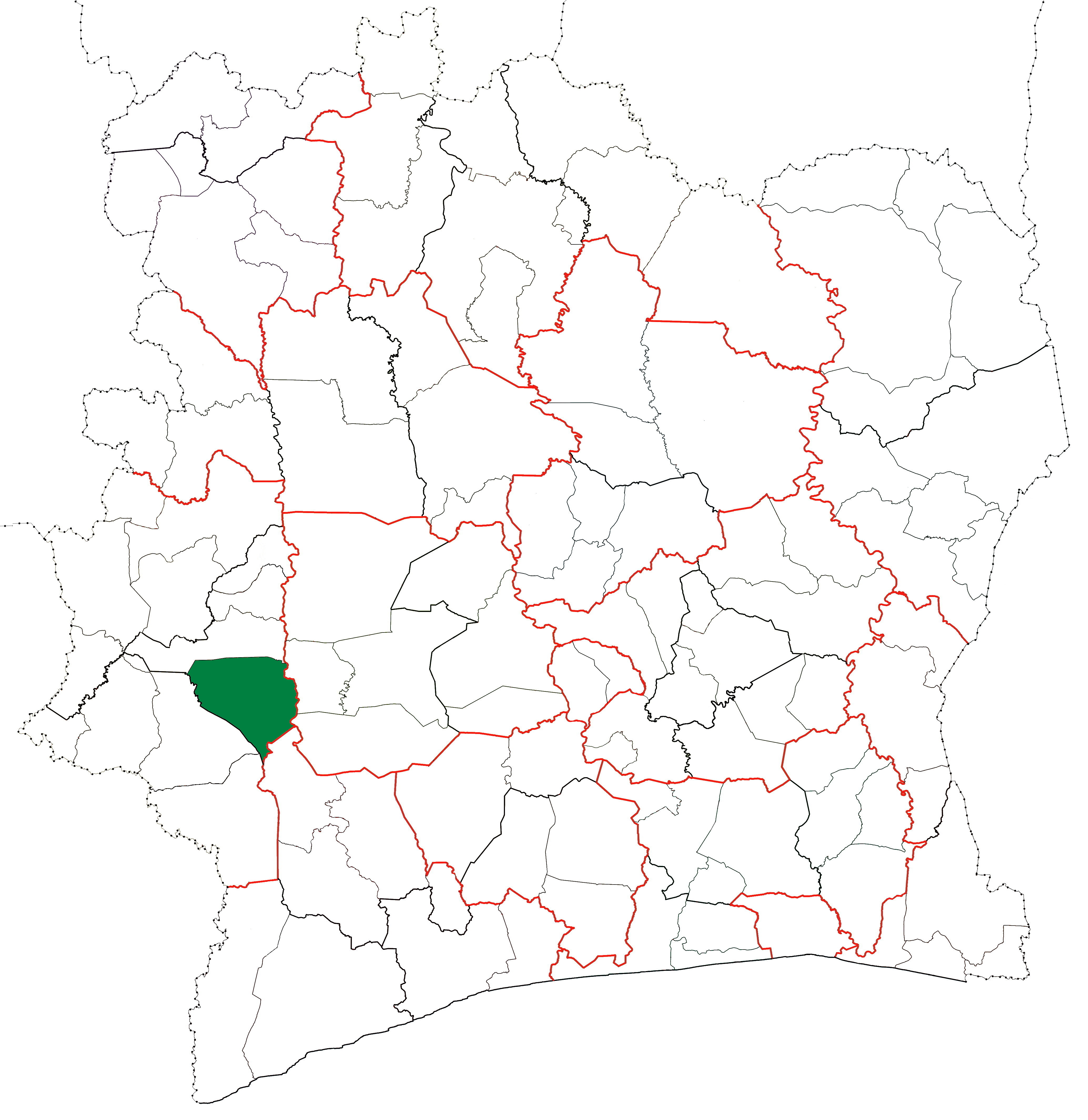
- Location in Ivory Coast. Duékoué Department has retained the same boundaries since its creation in 1988.
- Country: Ivory Coast
- District: Montagnes
- Region: Guémon
- 1988: Established as a first-level subdivision via a division of Guiglo Dept
- 1997: Converted to a second-level subdivision
- 2000: Transferred to the new Moyen-Cavally Region
- 2011: Converted to a third-level subdivision
- Departmental seat: Duékoué

Government
  - Prefect: Sory Sangaré

Area
  - Total: 2,900 km^{2} (1,100 sq mi)

Population (2021 census)
  - Total: 420,911
  - Density: 150/km^{2} (380/sq mi)
- Time zone: UTC+0 (GMT)

Duékoué Department is a department of Guémon Region in Montagnes District, Ivory Coast. In 2021, its population was 420,911 and its seat is the settlement of Duékoué. The sub-prefectures of the department are Bagohouo, Duékoué, Gbapleu, Guéhiébly, and Guézon.

== History ==
Duékoué Department was created in 1988 as a first-level subdivision via a split-off from Guiglo Department.

In 1997, regions were introduced as new first-level subdivisions of Ivory Coast; as a result, all departments were converted into second-level subdivisions. Duékoué Department was initially included in Dix-Huit Montagnes Region, but in 2000 it was transferred to the newly created Moyen-Cavally Region.

In 2011, districts were introduced as new first-level subdivisions of Ivory Coast. At the same time, regions were reorganised and became second-level subdivisions and all departments were converted into third-level subdivisions. At this time, Duékoué Department became part of Guémon Region in Montagnes District.
