= Guémon =

Coordinates: 6°25′N 7°30′W

Guémon Region Région du Guémon Yémahin Region Région du Yémahin
- Region
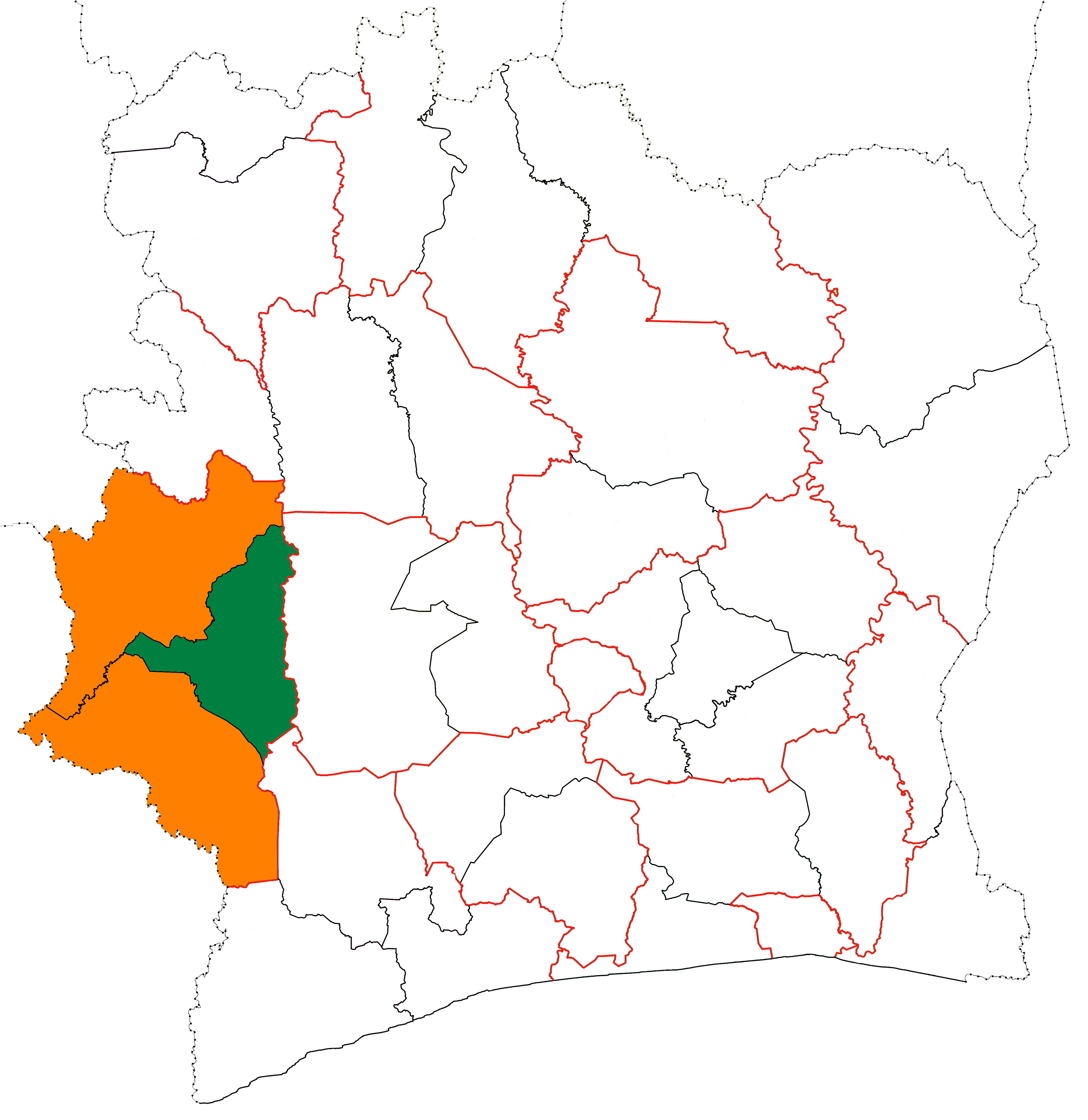
- Location of Guémon Region (green) in Ivory Coast and in Montagnes District
- Country: Ivory Coast
- District: Montagnes
- Established: 2011
- Regional seat: Duékoué

Government
  - Prefect: Sory Sangaré
  - Council President: Evariste Tié Méambly

Area
  - Total: 7,180 km^{2} (2,770 sq mi)

Population (2021 census)
  - Total: 930,893
  - Density: 130/km^{2} (336/sq mi)
- Time zone: UTC+0 (GMT)

Guémon Region (also known as Yémahin Region) is one of the 31 regions of Ivory Coast. Since its establishment in 2011, it has been one of three regions in Montagnes District. The seat of the region is Duékoué and the region's population in the 2021 census was 930,893.

Guémon is currently divided into four departments: Bangolo, Duékoué, Facobly, and Kouibly.

== Name ==
In the 2011 decree that created the region, Guémon was referred to alternatively as the region of "Yémahin". Since its creation, the region has more commonly been referred to as "Guémon".
