= Tonkpi =

Coordinates: 7°24′N 7°33′W

Tonkpi Region Région du Tonkpi
- Region
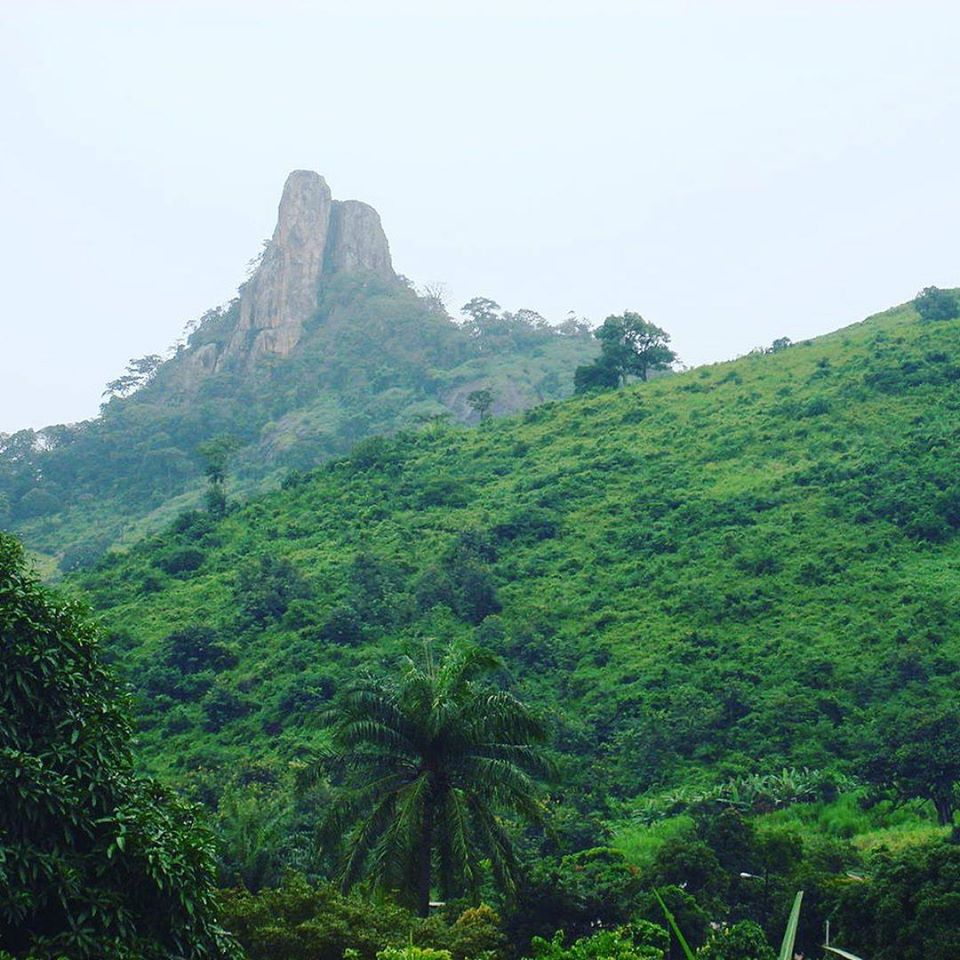
- The "Dent de Ment" (Teeth of Man) rock

- Seal
- Motto: "Union-Développement-Paix"
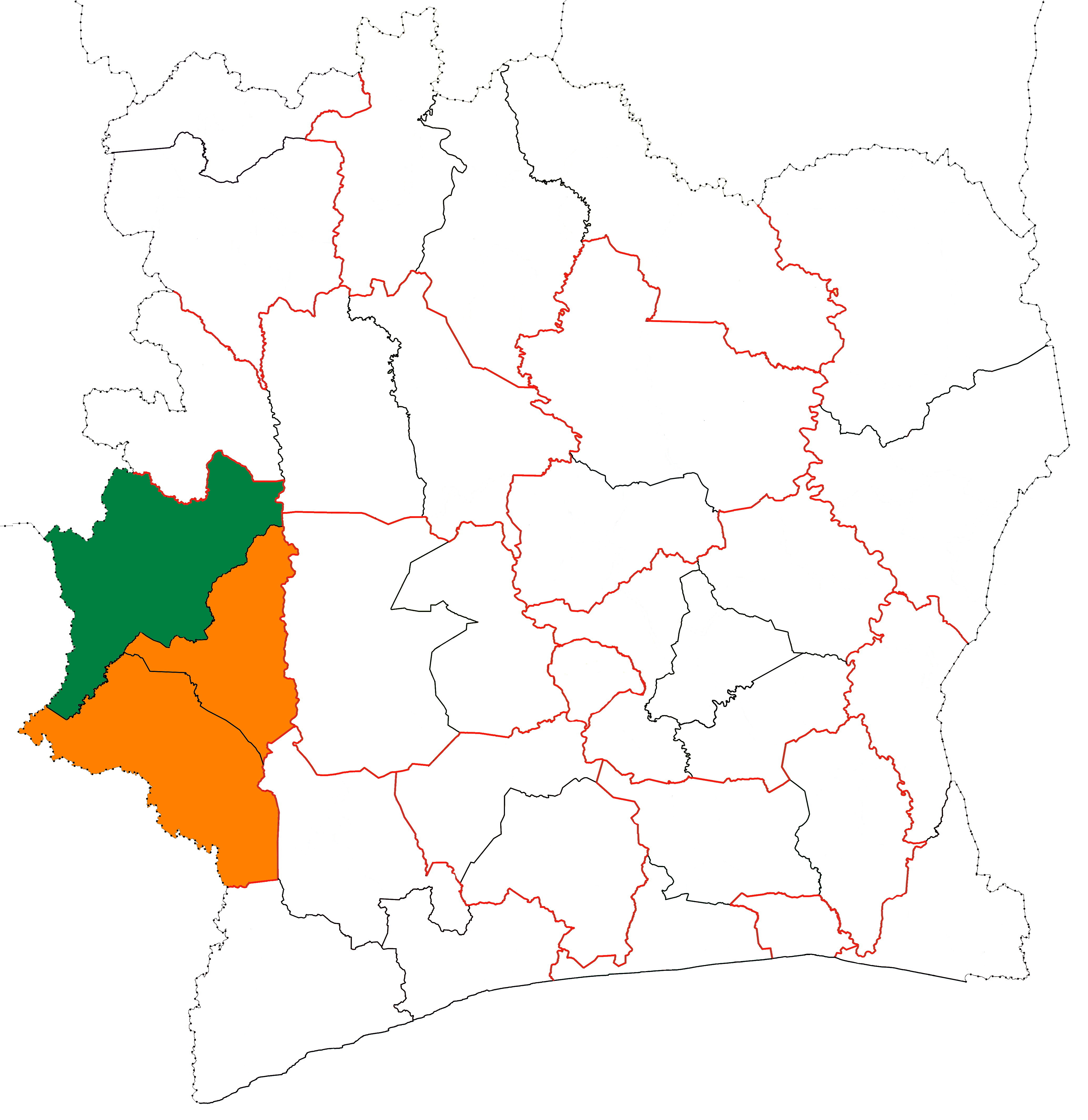
- Location of Tonkpi Region (green) in Ivory Coast and in Montagnes District
- Country: Ivory Coast
- District: Montagnes
- Established: 2011
- Regional seat: Man

Government
  - Prefect: Kayaha Jérôme Soro
  - Council President: Mela Gaston Wohi

Area
  - Total: 12,180 km^{2} (4,700 sq mi)

Population (2021 census)
  - Total: 1,387,909
  - Density: 113.9/km^{2} (295.1/sq mi)
- Time zone: UTC+0 (GMT)

Tonkpi Region is one of the 31 regions of Ivory Coast. Since its establishment in 2011, it has been one of three regions in Montagnes District. The seat of the region is Man and the region's population in the 2021 census was 1,387,909, predominantly of Dan (Yacouba) ethnicity.

Tonkpi is currently divided into five departments: Biankouma, Danané, Man, Sipilou, and Zouan-Hounien.
