= Montagnes District =

District of Ivory Coast

Coordinates: 7°24′N 7°33′W

Montagnes District District des Montagnes
- District
- Country: Ivory Coast
- Established: 2011
- Capital: Man

Area
  - Total: 30,825 km^{2} (11,902 sq mi)

Population (2021 census)
  - Total: 3,027,023
  - Density: 98.200/km^{2} (254.34/sq mi)
- HDI (2022): 0.492 low · 10th of 14

Montagnes District (French: District des Montagnes pronounced [mɔ̃.taɲ], "Mountains") is one of the 14 administrative districts of Ivory Coast. The district is located in the western part of the country, bordering Liberia and Guinea to the west, Woroba District to the north, Sassandra-Marahoué District to the east, and Bas-Sassandra District to the south. The capital of the district is Man.

== Creation ==
Montagnes District was created in a 2011 administrative reorganisation of the subdivisions of Ivory Coast. The territory of the district was composed by merging the former regions of Dix-Huit Montagnes and Moyen-Cavally. The district was suppressed in 2014 and restored as an autonomous district in 2021.

== Geography ==
- N'zo Partial Faunal Reserve

== Administrative divisions ==
Montagnes District was subdivided into three regions and the following departments:

- Cavally Region (region seat in Guiglo)
  - Bloléquin Department
  - Guiglo Department
  - Toulépleu Department
  - Taï Department
- Guémon Region (region seat in Duékoué)
  - Bangolo Department
  - Duékoué Department
  - Kouibly Department
  - Facobly Department
- Tonkpi Region (region seat also in Man)
  - Biankouma Department
  - Danané Department
  - Man Department
  - Zouan-Hounien Department
  - Sipilou Department

== Population ==
According to the 2021 census, Montagnes District has a population of 3,027,023, making it the second most populous district in Ivory Coast, behind only Abidjan Autonomous District.

=== Religion ===
Religion in Montagnes (2021 census)
| Religion | Percent |
| Christianity | 37.8% |
| Islam | 31.5% |
| None | 23.8% |
| Traditional | 3.1% |
| Other | 3.8% |

Montagnes has a religiously diverse population. According to the 2021 census, Christianity is the plurality religion in the district (37.8%), followed by Islam (31.5%) and those with no religion (23.8%). A smaller share of residents adhere to traditional religions or other faiths.
