= Guran (disambiguation) =

Guran is a comic strip character.

Guran (Persian: گوران) may also refer to:

== Places ==
=== France ===
- Guran, Haute-Garonne, a town in France

=== Iran ===
- Guran, Alborz, a village in Alborz Province, Iran
- Guran, East Azerbaijan, a village in East Azerbaijan Province, Iran
- Guran, Hormozgan, a village in Hormozgan Province, Iran
- Guran, Baft, a village in Kerman Province, Iran
- Guran, Zarand, a village in Kerman Province, Iran
- Guran-e Gowra, a village in Kermanshah Province, Iran
- Guran, Lorestan, a village in Lorestan Province, Iran
- Guran, Zanjan, a village in Zanjan Province, Iran

== People ==
- Guran (Kurdish name), a Kurdish name
- Guran (Kurdish tribe), a Kurdish tribe of Western Iran

== See also ==
- Goran (disambiguation)
- Gurans (disambiguation)
