= Argut-Dessous =

- Commune
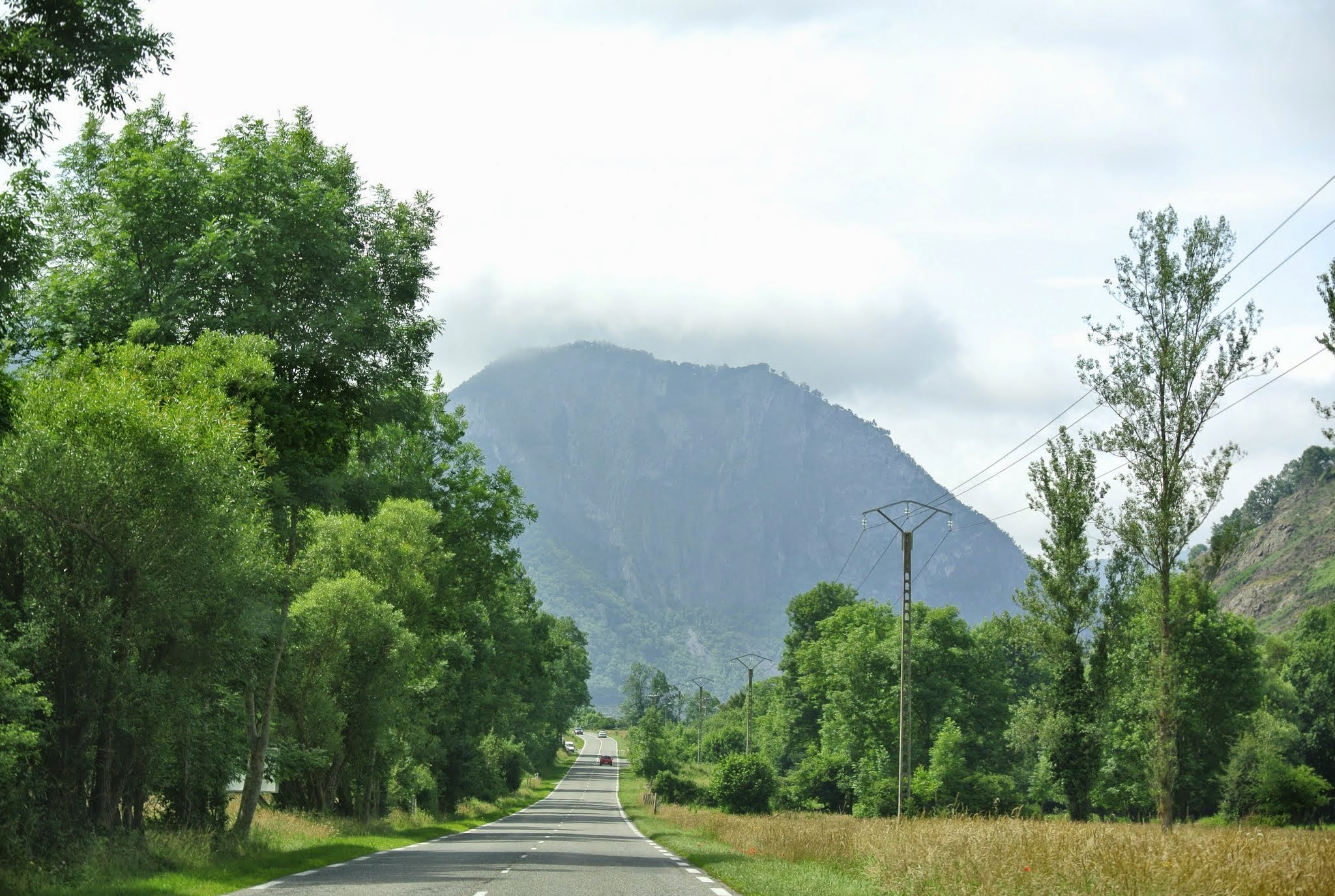
- The road in Argut-Dessous

- Coat of arms
- Location of Argut-Dessous
- Location within France Location within Occitanie
- Coordinates: 42°53′24″N 0°43′07″E
- Country: France
- Region: Occitania
- Department: Haute-Garonne
- Arrondissement: Saint-Gaudens
- Canton: Bagnères-de-Luchon
- Intercommunality: CC Pyrénées Haut-Garonnaises

Government
  - Mayor (2020–2026): Claude Jacquard
- Area^{1}: 2.70 km^{2} (1.04 sq mi)
- Elevation: 626 m (2,054 ft)
- Highest elevation: 1,090 m (3,580 ft)
- Lowest elevation: 513 m (1,683 ft)
- Population (2023): 21
  - Density: 7.8/km^{2} (20/sq mi)
- Time zone: UTC+01:00 (CET)
  - Summer (DST): UTC+02:00 (CEST)
- INSEE/Postal code: 31015 /31440
- ^{1} French Land Register data, which excludes lakes, ponds, glaciers > 1 km^{2} (0.386 sq mi or 247 acres) and river estuaries.

Argut-Dessous (French pronunciation: [aʁɡy dəsu]; Occitan: Argut Sota) is a commune in the Haute-Garonne department in southwestern France.

== Geography ==
Located in the Pyrenees, the commune is bordered by four other communes: Saint-Béat-Lez to the north, Fos to the south, Boutx to the east, and finally by Arlos to the west.

== Population ==
Historical population
Year	Pop.	±% p.a.
1968	54	—
1975	55	+0.26%
1982	45	−2.83%
1990	41	−1.16%
1999	33	−2.38%
2007	31	−0.78%
2012	29	−1.32%
2017	23	−4.53%
2023	21	−1.50%
Source: INSEE

== See also ==
- Communes of the Haute-Garonne department
