= Gurvan =

Gurvan (Persian: گوروان), also known as Guzvan, may refer to:

- Gurvan-e Bozorg
- Gurvan-e Kuchak
