= Göran =

Göran(Swedish name)
- Pronunciation: [ˈjœ̂ːran]
- Gender: Male
- Language: Swedish

Origin
- Meaning: farmer, earth-worker

Other names
- Alternative spelling: Jöran
- Related names: George

Göran (pronounced [ˈjœ̂ːran]) is a Swedish form of George, not to be confused with the Slavic Goran.

Notable people with the name include:

- Göran Andersson (sailor, born 1939) (1939–2020), Swedish sailor in the 1960 Olympics
- Göran Andersson (sailor, born 1956), Swedish sailor in the 1980 Olympics
- Göran Bror Benny Andersson (born 1946), Swedish musician, composer, and member of the pop band ABBA
- Göran Folkestad (born 1952), Swedish songwriter, singer, and music professor
- Göran Gentele (1917–1972), Swedish opera manager, director, and actor
- Göran Gunnarsson (born 1950), Swedish lieutenant general
- Göran Hasselmark (born 1936), Swedish diplomat
- Göran Hägglund (born 1959), Swedish politician, former leader of the Christian Democrats, and former Minister for Social Affairs
- Göran Högosta (born 1954), Swedish ice hockey player
- Göran Johansson (disambiguation), multiple people
- Göran Karlsson (cyclist) (1937–2020), Swedish cyclist
- Göran Kropp (1966–2002), Swedish adventurer and mountaineer
- Göran Lagerberg (born 1947), Swedish singer, songwriter, and bass guitarist
- Göran Larsson (disambiguation), multiple people
- Göran Lennmarker (born 1943), Swedish politician
- Göran Magnusson (chemist) (1942–2000), Swedish chemist
- Göran Magnusson (politician) (1939–2010), Swedish politician
- Göran Malmqvist (1924–2019), Swedish linguist and literary historian
- Göran Mårtensson (born 1960), Swedish Army lieutenant general
- Göran Persson (born 1949), Swedish politician, former prime minister (1996–2006), and former leader of the Swedish Social Democratic Party
- Göran or Jöran Persson (c. 1530–1568), King Eric XIV of Sweden's most trusted counsellor and head of the king's network of spies
- Göran Persson i Simrishamn (born 1960), Swedish politician
- Göran Ryding (1916–2007), Swedish diplomat
- Göran Söllscher (born 1955), Swedish classical guitarist

== See also ==
- Joran, a list of people with the given name Jöran, Jøran or Joran
