= Gorani =

Gorani may refer to:

== Places ==
- Gorani, Croatia, a village in the municipality of Skrad, Croatia
- Gorani, Konjic, a village in the municipality of Konjic, Bosnia and Herzegovina
- Gorani, Visoko, a village in the city of Visoko, Bosnia and Herzegovina
- Gorani, a village in Uda Commune, Argeș County, Romania
- Gorâni, a village in Odăile Commune, Buzău County, Romania
- Goranoi, a village in the municipal unit Faris, Laconia, Greece

== People ==
- Gorani people, indigenous Slavic-speaking Muslims in Kosovo
- Gorani people, the Slavic ethnonym of Gorski Kotar's inhabitants
- Gorani, Hala, French-American journalist, news anchor, war correspondent

== Other uses ==
- Gorani dialect, South Slavic language spoken by the Gorani people
- Zaza–Gorani languages, Indo-Iranian languages
  - Gorani language, Western Iranian language
- Hala Gorani, CNN International anchorwoman
- Water deer (in Korean)

== See also ==
- Goran (disambiguation)
- Gurani (disambiguation)
- Gorane, a subgroup of the Toubou people of North Africa
- Gourané, a village in Ivory Coast
