= Gurans =

Guran may refer to:

- Gurans Rural Municipality, in Nepal
- Guran Kurds, an ethnic group
- Gurans (Transbaikal people), Russia

== See also ==
- Guran (disambiguation)
- Goran (disambiguation)
