= Gorjani =

Gorjani may refer to:

- Gorjani, Croatia, a village and municipality near Đakovo
- Gorjani (Užice), a village in Serbia
- Gorjani, the Slovene name of Montenars, a commune in Italy
- Gorjani Sutinski, a village near Radoboj, Croatia

== See also ==
- Gorani (disambiguation)
