= Labarthe-Rivière =

- Commune
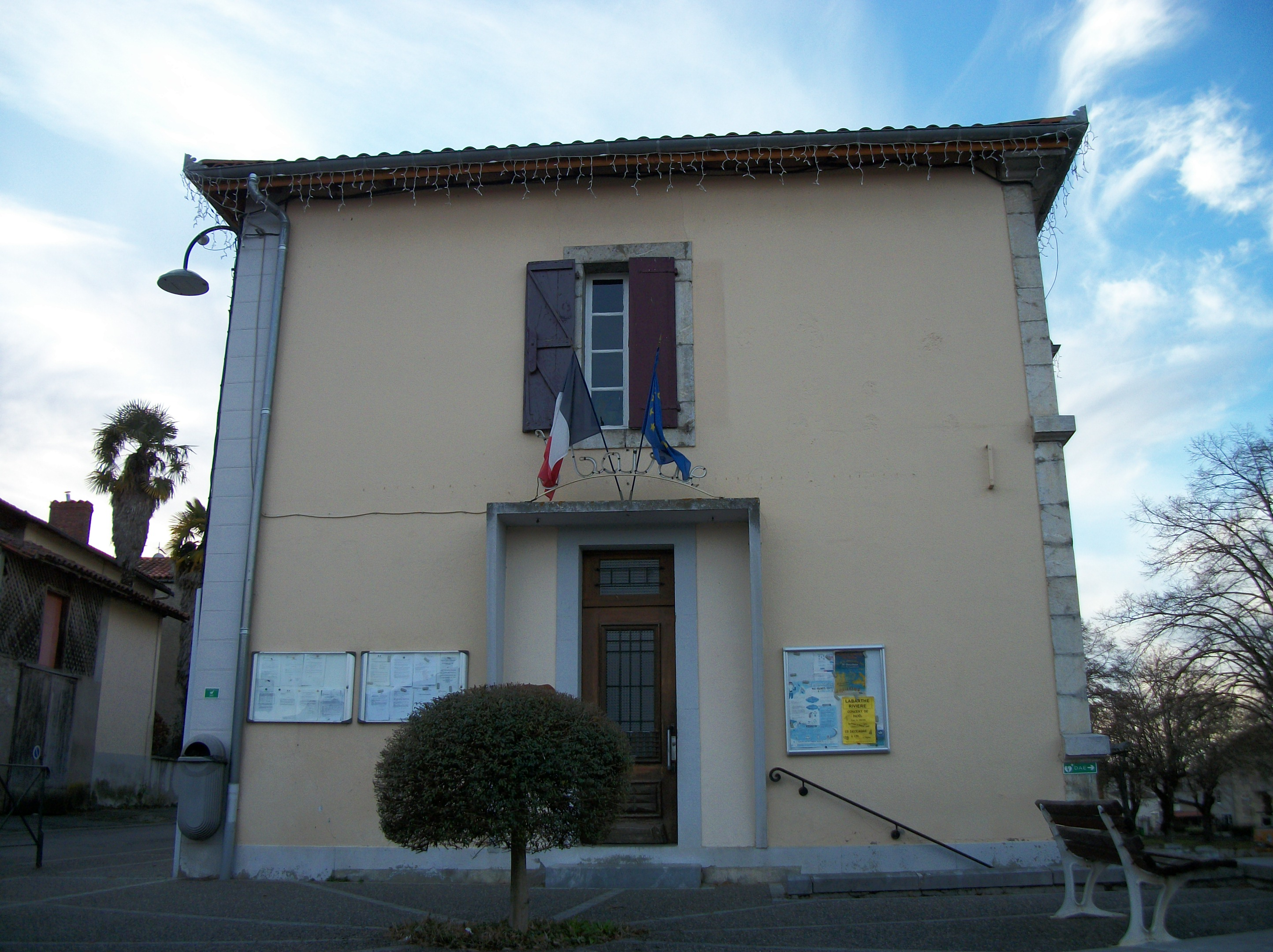
- The town hall in Labarthe-Rivière

- Coat of arms
- Location of Labarthe-Rivière
- Location within France Location within Occitanie
- Coordinates: 43°04′52″N 0°40′22″E
- Country: France
- Region: Occitania
- Department: Haute-Garonne
- Arrondissement: Saint-Gaudens
- Canton: Saint-Gaudens

Government
  - Mayor (2020–2026): Claire Vougny
- Area^{1}: 13.65 km^{2} (5.27 sq mi)
- Elevation: 394 m (1,293 ft)
- Highest elevation: 710 m (2,330 ft)
- Lowest elevation: 373 m (1,224 ft)
- Population (2023): 1,298
  - Density: 95.09/km^{2} (246.3/sq mi)
- Time zone: UTC+01:00 (CET)
  - Summer (DST): UTC+02:00 (CEST)
- INSEE/Postal code: 31247 /31800
- ^{1} French Land Register data, which excludes lakes, ponds, glaciers > 1 km^{2} (0.386 sq mi or 247 acres) and river estuaries.

Labarthe-Rivière (French pronunciation: [labaʁt ʁivjɛʁ]; Occitan: Era Barta d'Arribèra) is a commune in the Haute-Garonne department in southwestern France.

== Geography ==
=== Climate ===
Labarthe-Rivière has an oceanic climate (Köppen climate classification Cfb). The average annual temperature in Labarthe-Rivière is 11.7 °C (53.1 °F). The average annual rainfall is 745.9 mm (29.37 in) with May as the wettest month. The temperatures are highest on average in August, at around 19.9 °C (67.8 °F), and lowest in January, at around 4.1 °C (39.4 °F). The highest temperature ever recorded in Labarthe-Rivière was 40.0 °C (104.0 °F) on 30 July 1983; the coldest temperature ever recorded was −19.0 °C (−2.2 °F) on 9 January 1985.

Climate data for Labarthe-Rivière (1981−2010 normals, extremes 1975−2000)
Month	Jan	Feb	Mar	Apr	May	Jun	Jul	Aug	Sep	Oct	Nov	Dec	Year
Record high °C (°F)	20.0 (68.0)	24.0 (75.2)	27.0 (80.6)	26.5 (79.7)	31.5 (88.7)	36.0 (96.8)	40.0 (104.0)	38.0 (100.4)	36.0 (96.8)	29.5 (85.1)	24.0 (75.2)	25.5 (77.9)	40.0 (104.0)
Mean daily maximum °C (°F)	9.5 (49.1)	11.1 (52.0)	13.9 (57.0)	15.7 (60.3)	19.9 (67.8)	22.9 (73.2)	25.9 (78.6)	26.1 (79.0)	23.2 (73.8)	18.5 (65.3)	13.3 (55.9)	10.4 (50.7)	17.6 (63.7)
Daily mean °C (°F)	4.1 (39.4)	5.4 (41.7)	7.9 (46.2)	9.7 (49.5)	14.0 (57.2)	17.2 (63.0)	19.7 (67.5)	19.9 (67.8)	16.7 (62.1)	12.4 (54.3)	7.6 (45.7)	5.0 (41.0)	11.7 (53.1)
Mean daily minimum °C (°F)	−1.3 (29.7)	−0.2 (31.6)	1.8 (35.2)	3.7 (38.7)	8.1 (46.6)	11.5 (52.7)	13.5 (56.3)	13.6 (56.5)	10.1 (50.2)	6.3 (43.3)	1.9 (35.4)	−0.3 (31.5)	5.8 (42.4)
Record low °C (°F)	−19.0 (−2.2)	−10.0 (14.0)	−7.5 (18.5)	−3.5 (25.7)	−0.5 (31.1)	3.0 (37.4)	6.0 (42.8)	5.0 (41.0)	1.0 (33.8)	−3.5 (25.7)	−10.5 (13.1)	−11.0 (12.2)	−19.0 (−2.2)
Average precipitation mm (inches)	63.5 (2.50)	45.1 (1.78)	55.6 (2.19)	81.4 (3.20)	84.2 (3.31)	60.9 (2.40)	52.2 (2.06)	56.5 (2.22)	60.3 (2.37)	59.0 (2.32)	65.5 (2.58)	61.7 (2.43)	745.9 (29.37)
Average precipitation days (≥ 1.0 mm)	9.0	7.5	8.5	10.4	10.6	7.6	5.9	7.5	7.6	8.6	9.0	9.2	101.4
Source: Météo-France

== Population ==
Historical population
Year	Pop.	±% p.a.
1968	1,000	—
1975	1,177	+2.36%
1982	1,195	+0.22%
1990	1,198	+0.03%
1999	1,152	−0.43%
2007	1,298	+1.50%
2012	1,361	+0.95%
2017	1,332	−0.43%
2023	1,298	−0.43%
Source: INSEE

== Gallery ==
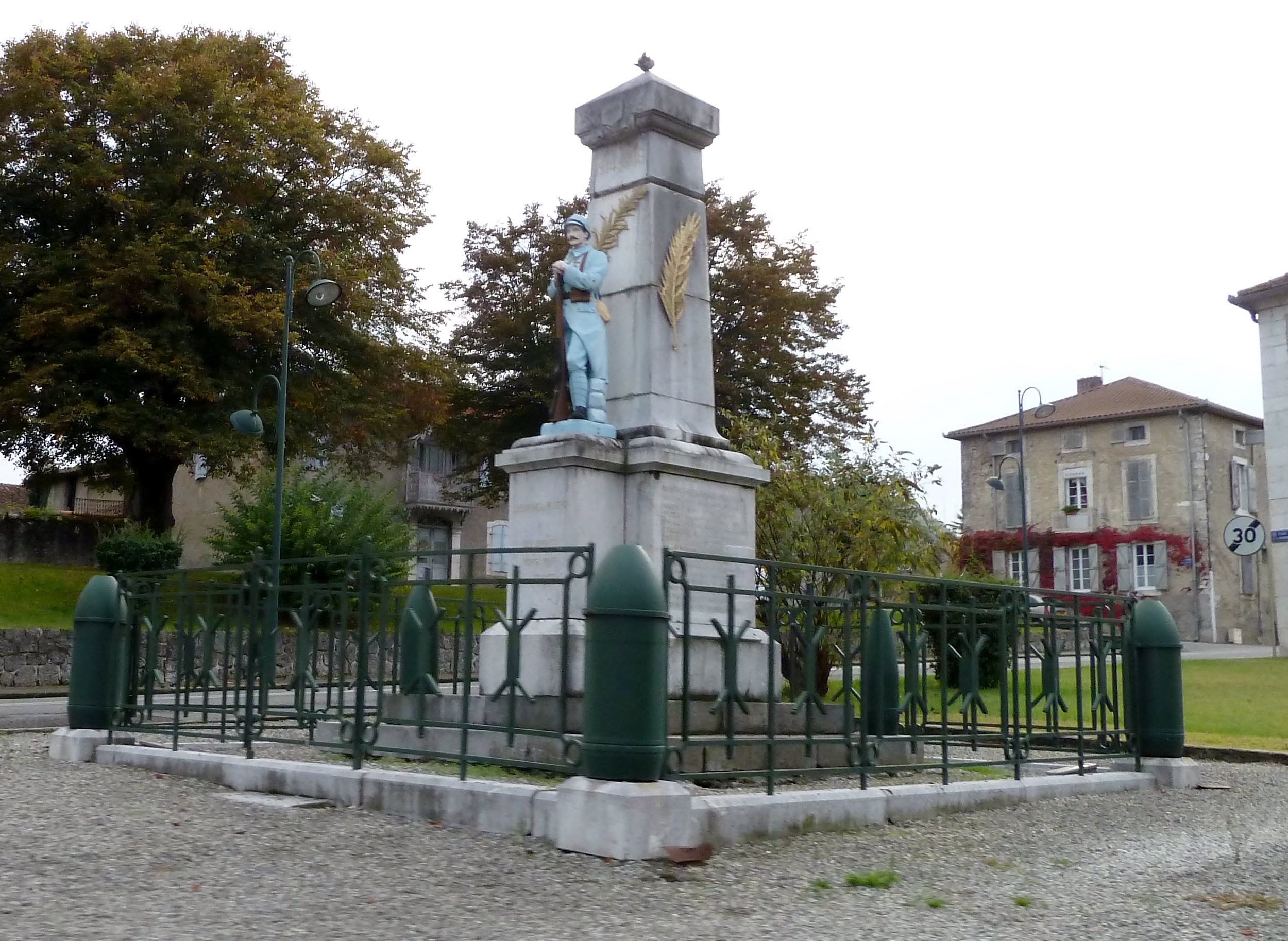
Monument to the dead

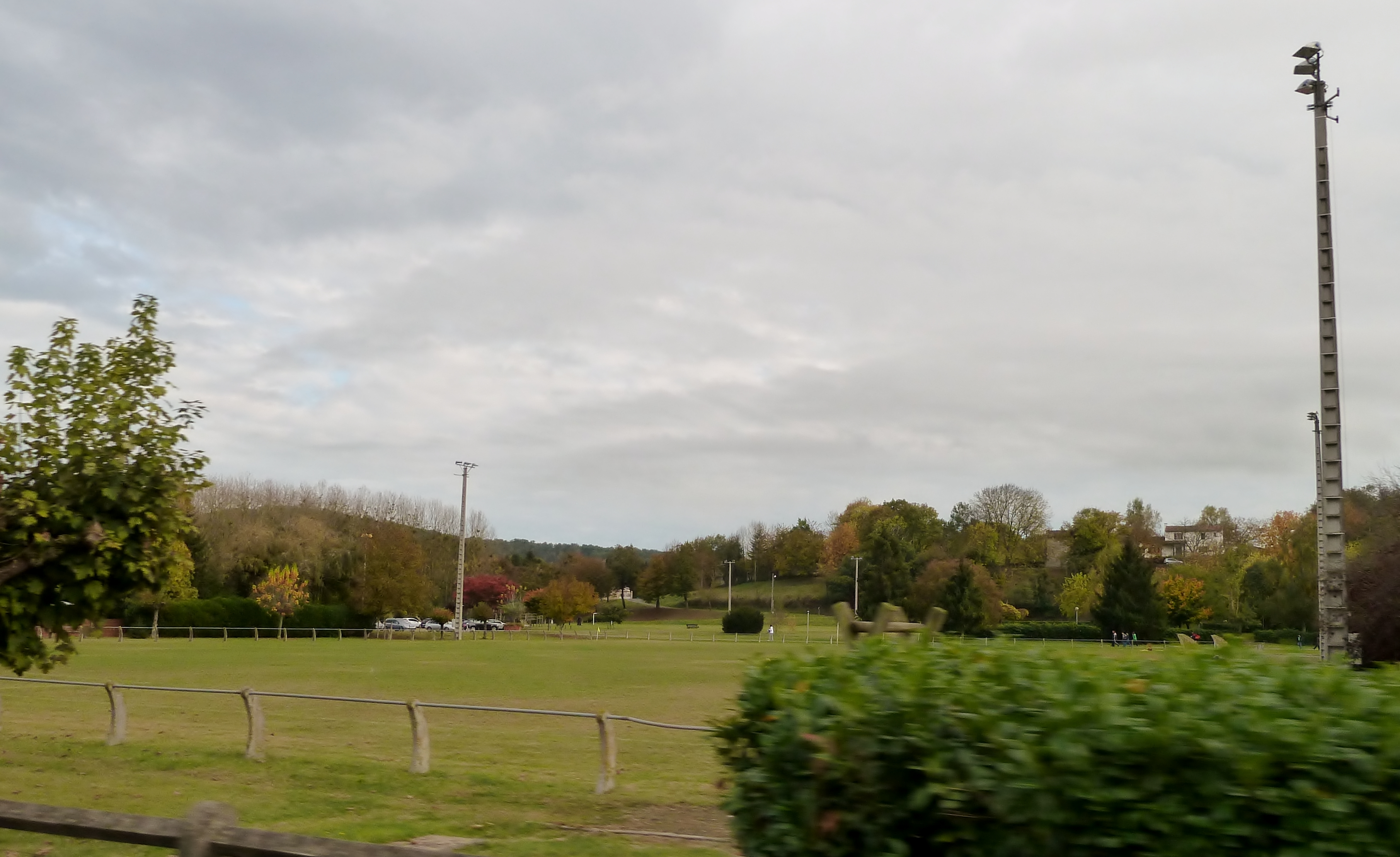
Sports fields

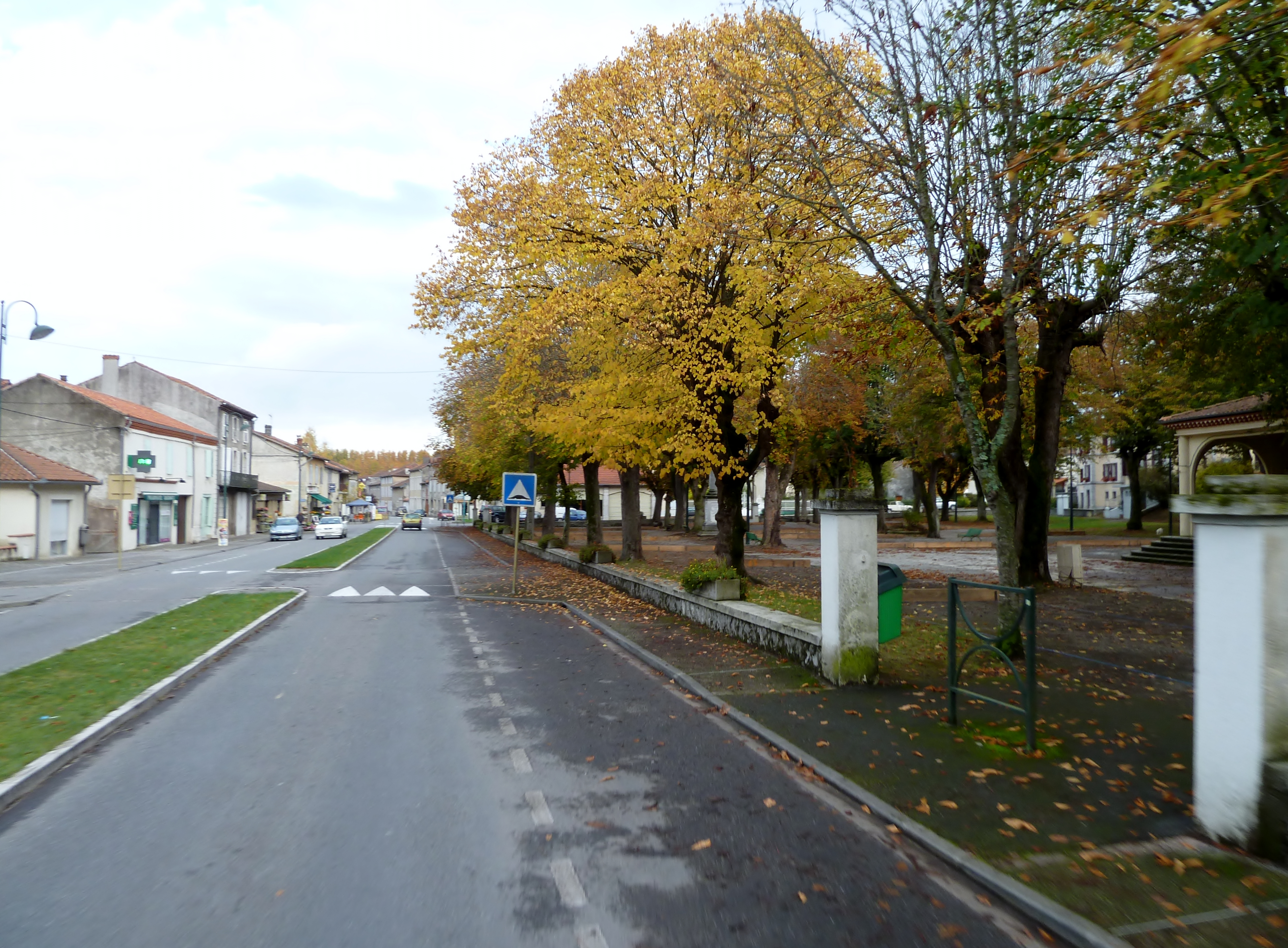

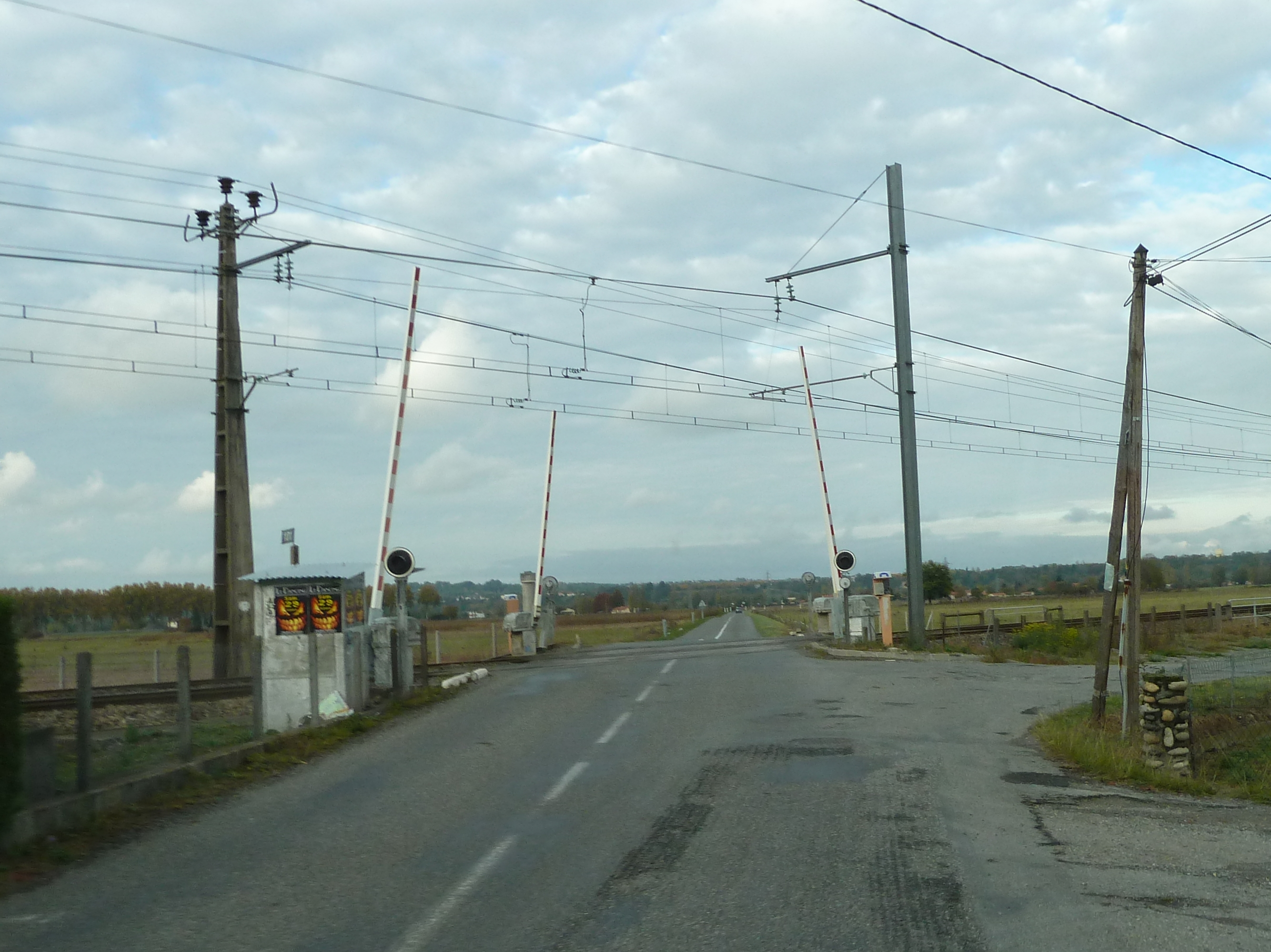
Rail tracks

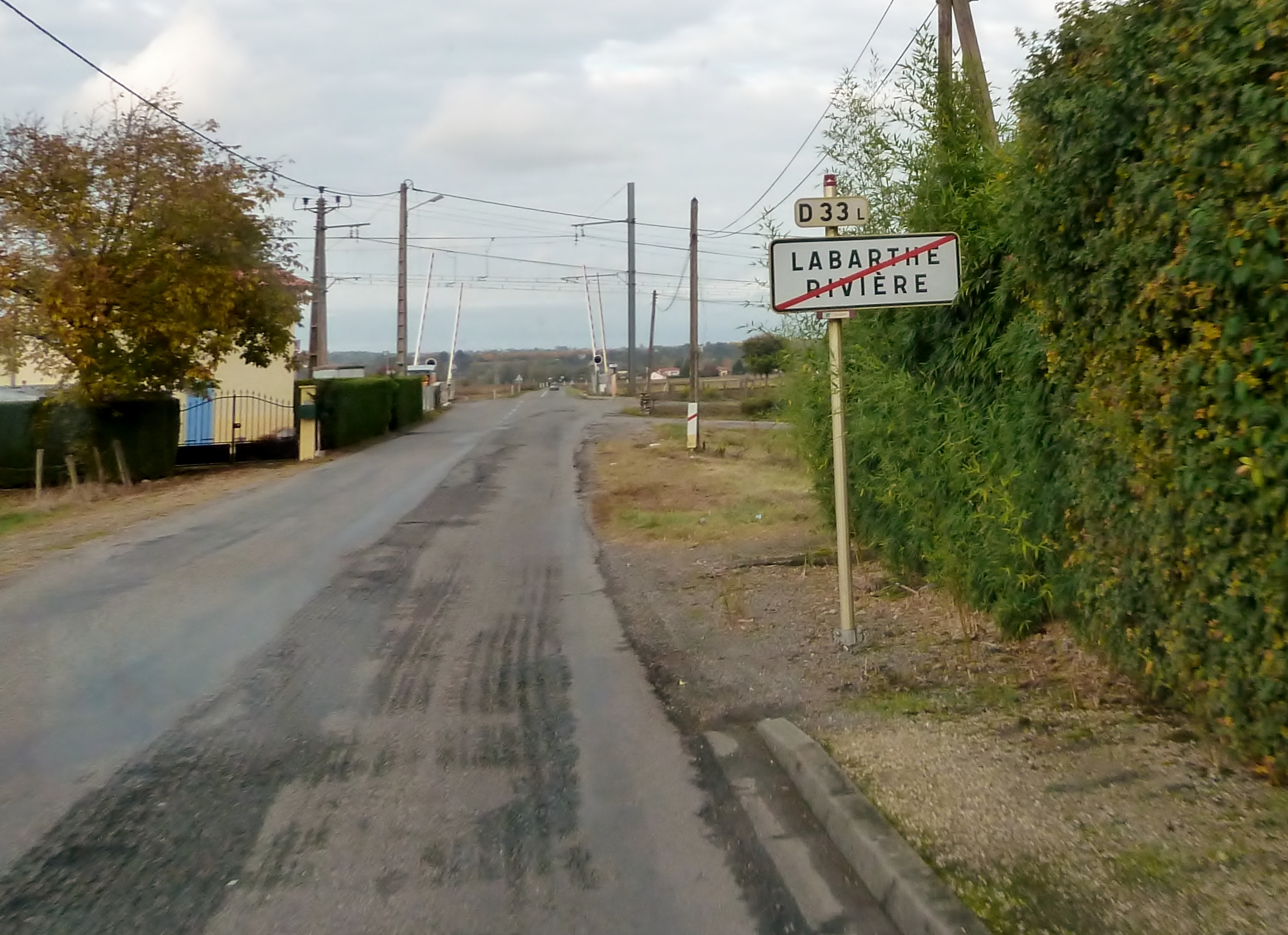
Commune exit

== See also ==
Communes of the Haute-Garonne department
