= Saint-Plancard =

- Commune
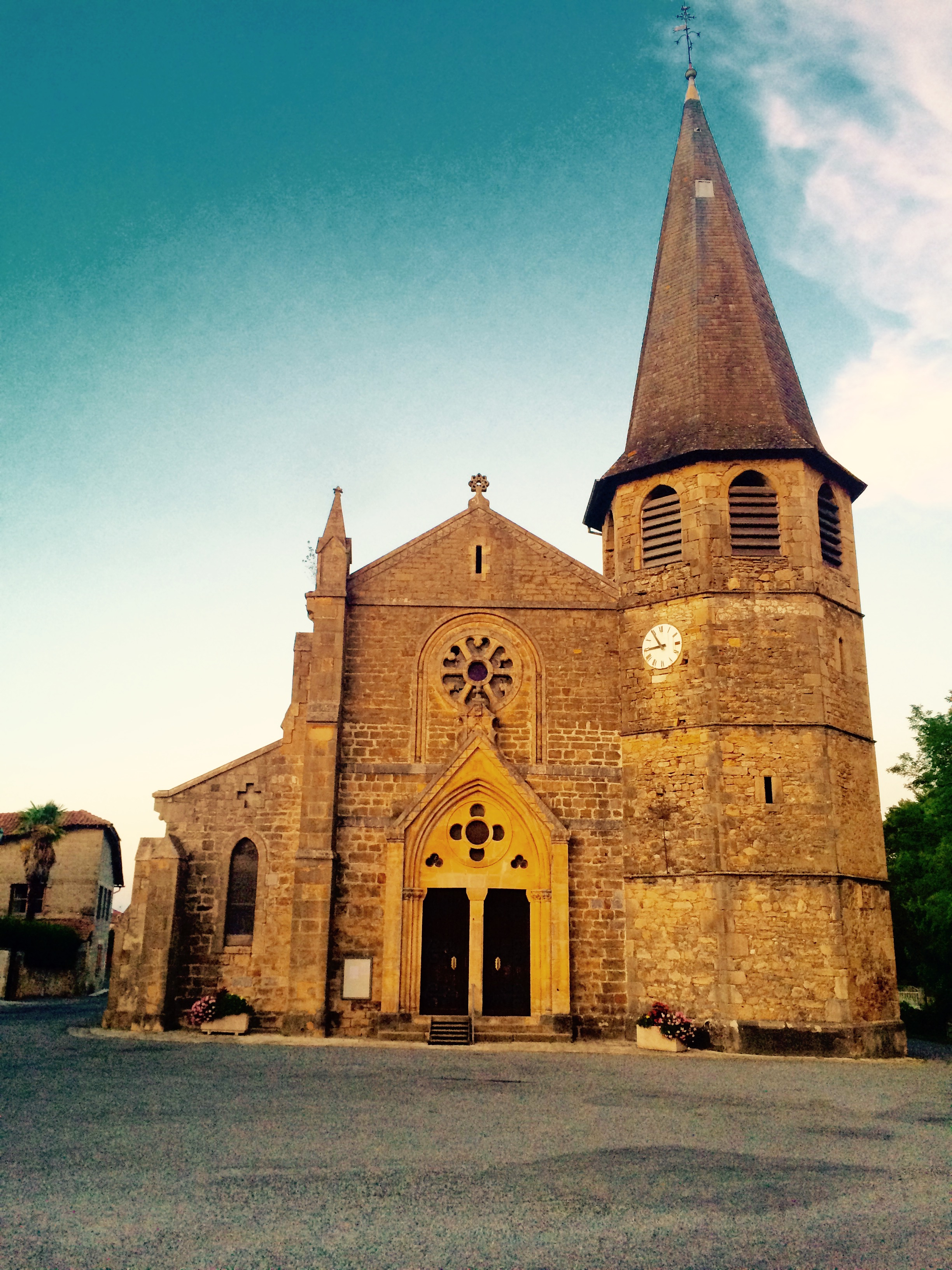
- The church of Saint Pancrace, Saint-Plancard

- Coat of arms
- Location of Saint-Plancard
- Location within France Location within Occitanie
- Coordinates: 43°10′16″N 0°34′30″E
- Country: France
- Region: Occitania
- Department: Haute-Garonne
- Arrondissement: Saint-Gaudens
- Canton: Saint-Gaudens
- Intercommunality: CC Cœur et Coteaux du Comminges

Government
  - Mayor (2020–2026): Marie-Hélène Fontaneau
- Area^{1}: 16.09 km^{2} (6.21 sq mi)
- Elevation: 370 m (1,210 ft)
- Highest elevation: 530 m (1,740 ft)
- Lowest elevation: 349 m (1,145 ft)
- Population (2023): 398
  - Density: 24.7/km^{2} (64.1/sq mi)
- Time zone: UTC+01:00 (CET)
  - Summer (DST): UTC+02:00 (CEST)
- INSEE/Postal code: 31513 /31580
- Website: https://saintplancard.com
- ^{1} French Land Register data, which excludes lakes, ponds, glaciers > 1 km^{2} (0.386 sq mi or 247 acres) and river estuaries.

Saint-Plancard (French pronunciation: [sɛ̃ plɑ̃kaʁ]; Gascon: Sent Blancat) is a commune in the Haute-Garonne department in southwestern France.

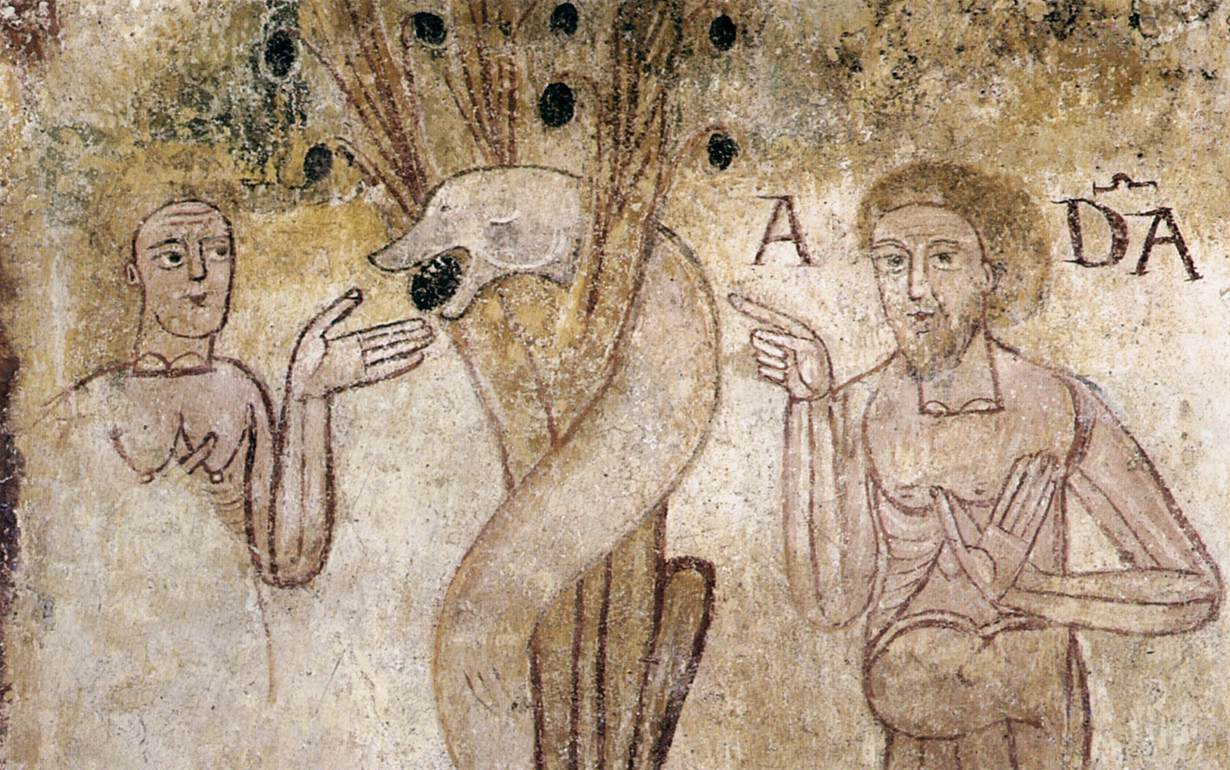
12th century fresco in 'la chapelle Saint-Jean des Vignes', Saint-Plancard.

== Population ==
As of 2019, there were 268 dwellings in the commune, of which 198 primary residences.

Historical population
Year	Pop.	±% p.a.
1968	475	—
1975	401	−2.39%
1982	476	+2.48%
1990	452	−0.64%
1999	372	−2.14%
2007	383	+0.36%
2012	362	−1.12%
2017	364	+0.11%
2023	398	+1.50%
Source: INSEE

== See also ==
- Communes of the Haute-Garonne department
