= Goran =

Goran may refer to:

== Ethnic groups ==
- Gorane, or Goran, an ethnic group of northern Africa
- Goran (Kurdish tribe), an ethnic group of the Middle East
- Gorani (ethnic group), an ethnic group of southeastern Europe

== Other uses ==
- Göran, a Swedish name
- Goran (Slavic name), a Slavic name
- Goran (Kurdish name), a Kurdish name
- Goran language, a language of northern Africa
- Goran, Azerbaijan, a village in Azerbaijan
- Goran (film), a 2016 Croatian film

== See also ==
- Gorani (disambiguation)
- Guran (disambiguation)
