= Joran =

Joran, Jöran or Jøran is a masculine given name. Bearers include:

- Jöran Hägglund (born 1959), Swedish politician
- Jöran Jermas, an alias of Israel Shamir (born 1947 or 1948), Swedish writer, journalist, and promoter of antisemitism and Holocaust denial
- Jøran Kallmyr (born 1978), Norwegian politician and jurist, former Minister of Justice
- Jöran Nordberg (1677–1744), Swedish historian
- Jöran Persson (c. 1530–1568), King Eric XIV of Sweden's most trusted counsellor and head of the king's network of spies
- Joran Pot (born 1989), Dutch footballer and coach
- Joran van der Sloot (born 1987), Dutch convicted murderer and suspected serial killer
- Joran Vliegen (born 1993), Belgian tennis player
- Joran Wyseure (born 2001), Belgian cyclist

== See also ==
- Goran (disambiguation)
