= Saint-Laurent, Haute-Garonne =

Saint-Laurent
- Commune
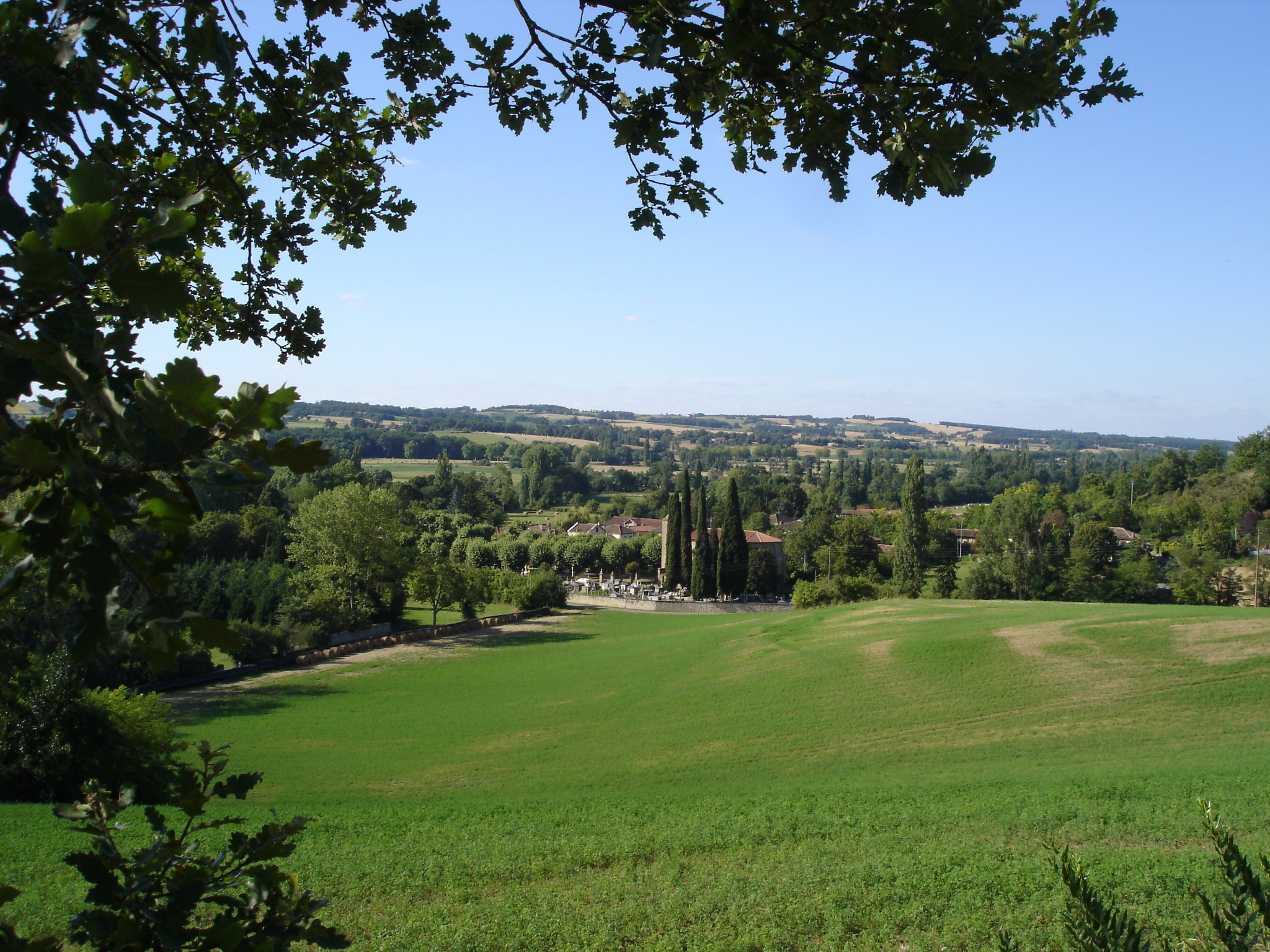
- A general view of Saint-Laurent

- Coat of arms
- Location of Saint-Laurent
- Location within France Location within Occitanie
- Coordinates: 43°19′36″N 0°47′59″E
- Country: France
- Region: Occitania
- Department: Haute-Garonne
- Arrondissement: Saint-Gaudens
- Canton: Cazères

Government
  - Mayor (2020–2026): Daniel Pitout
- Area^{1}: 9.39 km^{2} (3.63 sq mi)
- Highest elevation: 341 m (1,119 ft)
- Lowest elevation: 211 m (692 ft)
- Population (2023): 178
  - Density: 19.0/km^{2} (49.1/sq mi)
- Time zone: UTC+01:00 (CET)
  - Summer (DST): UTC+02:00 (CEST)
- INSEE/Postal code: 31494 /31230
- ^{1} French Land Register data, which excludes lakes, ponds, glaciers > 1 km^{2} (0.386 sq mi or 247 acres) and river estuaries.

Saint-Laurent (French pronunciation: [sɛ̃ loʁɑ̃]; Occitan: Sent Laurenç), also referred to as Saint-Laurent-sur-Save, is a commune in the Haute-Garonne department in southwestern France.

== Population ==
Historical population
Year	Pop.	±% p.a.
1968	205	—
1975	177	−2.08%
1982	136	−3.69%
1990	141	+0.45%
1999	157	+1.20%
2007	160	+0.24%
2012	167	+0.86%
2017	181	+1.62%
2023	178	−0.28%
Source: INSEE

== See also ==
- Communes of the Haute-Garonne department
