= Bélesta-en-Lauragais =

Bélesta-en-Lauragais Bèl Estar (Occitan)
- Commune
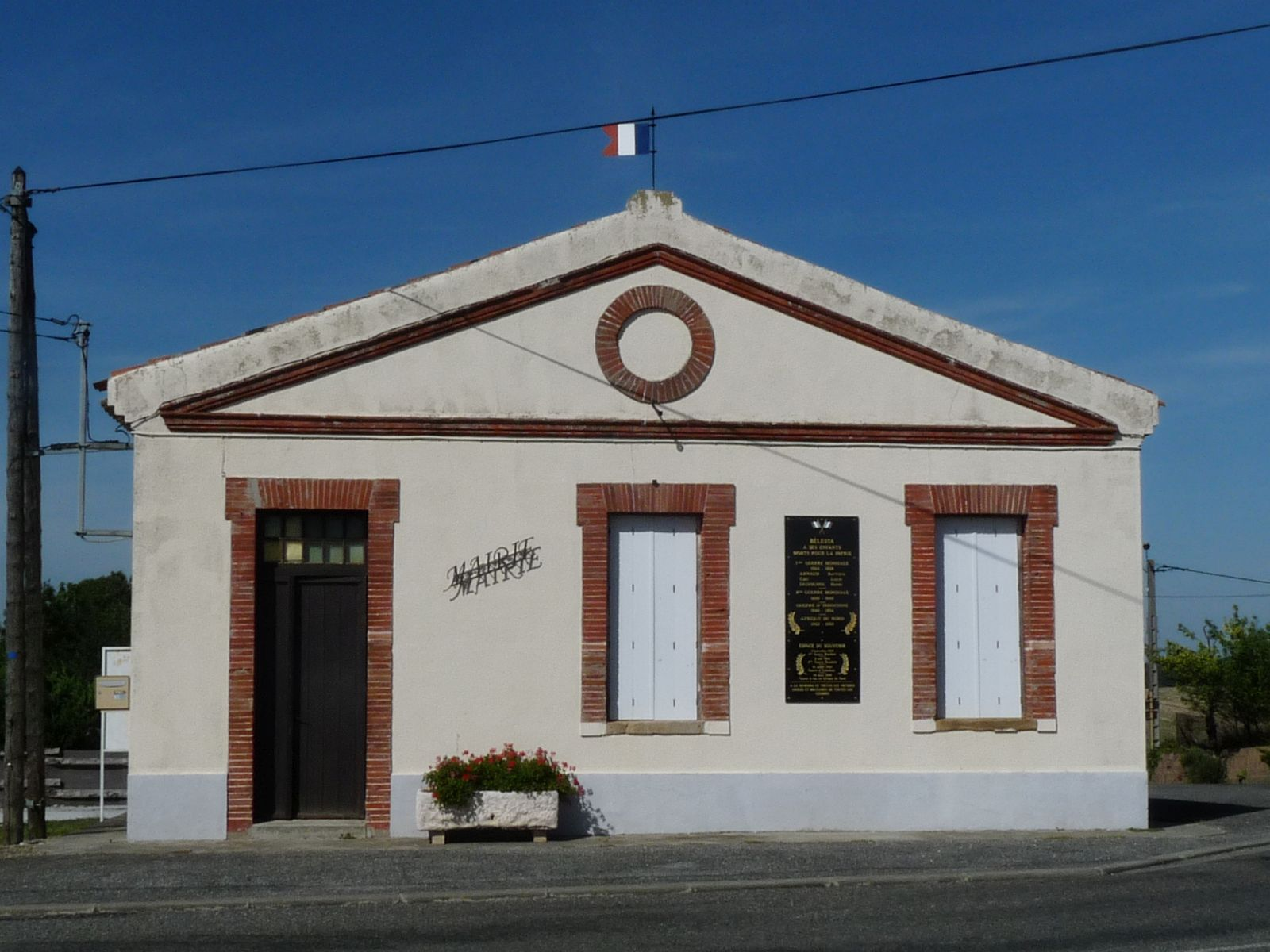
- The town hall in Bélesta-en-Lauragais

- Coat of arms
- Location of Bélesta-en-Lauragais
- Location within France Location within Occitanie
- Coordinates: 43°26′32″N 1°49′24″E
- Country: France
- Region: Occitania
- Department: Haute-Garonne
- Arrondissement: Toulouse
- Canton: Revel
- Intercommunality: CC aux sources du Canal du Midi

Government
  - Mayor (2020–2026): Jean-Luc Gouxette
- Area^{1}: 5.59 km^{2} (2.16 sq mi)
- Elevation: 260 m (850 ft)
- Highest elevation: 300 m (980 ft)
- Lowest elevation: 209 m (686 ft)
- Population (2023): 114
  - Density: 20.4/km^{2} (52.8/sq mi)
- Time zone: UTC+01:00 (CET)
  - Summer (DST): UTC+02:00 (CEST)
- INSEE/Postal code: 31060 /31540
- ^{1} French Land Register data, which excludes lakes, ponds, glaciers > 1 km^{2} (0.386 sq mi or 247 acres) and river estuaries.

Bélesta-en-Lauragais (French pronunciation: [belɛsta ɑ̃ loʁaɡɛ], literally Bélesta in Lauragais; Occitan: Belestar de Lauragués) is a commune in the Haute-Garonne department in southwestern France.

== Population ==
Historical population
Year	Pop.	±% p.a.
1968	74	—
1975	61	−2.72%
1982	72	+2.40%
1990	66	−1.08%
1999	84	+2.72%
2007	110	+3.43%
2012	108	−0.37%
2017	115	+1.26%
2023	114	−0.15%
Source: INSEE

The inhabitants of the commune are known in French as Bélestais and Bélestaises.

== Astronomical observatory ==
A group of amateur astronomers formed the Association pour le Développement Amateur d’un Grand Instrument d’Observation (ADAGIO), which established the Bélesta Observatory in 1996. In 2019, the association donated the land from the Bélesta Observatory to the Société astronomique de France, with ADAGIO remaining the owner and operator of the telescopes.

== See also ==
- Communes of the Haute-Garonne department
