= Saint-Rustice =

- Commune
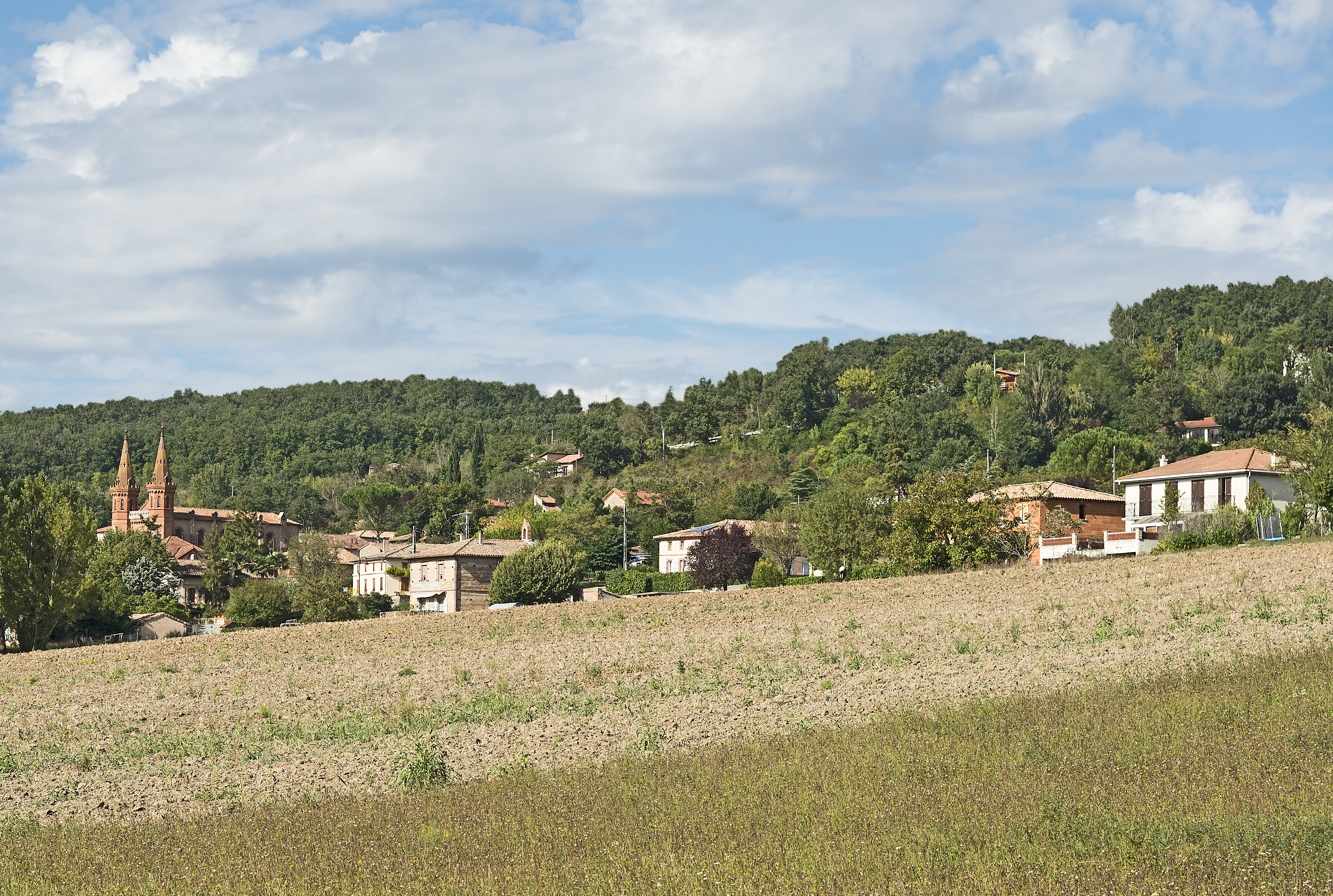
- Saint-Rustice
- Location of Saint-Rustice
- Location within France Location within Occitanie
- Coordinates: 43°48′23″N 1°19′43″E
- Country: France
- Region: Occitania
- Department: Haute-Garonne
- Arrondissement: Toulouse
- Canton: Villemur-sur-Tarn

Government
  - Mayor (2020–2026): Edmond Aussel
- Area^{1}: 2.36 km^{2} (0.91 sq mi)
- Elevation: 108 m (354 ft)
- Highest elevation: 217 m (712 ft)
- Lowest elevation: 107 m (351 ft)
- Population (2023): 439
  - Density: 186/km^{2} (482/sq mi)
- Time zone: UTC+01:00 (CET)
  - Summer (DST): UTC+02:00 (CEST)
- INSEE/Postal code: 31515 /31620
- ^{1} French Land Register data, which excludes lakes, ponds, glaciers > 1 km^{2} (0.386 sq mi or 247 acres) and river estuaries.

Saint-Rustice (French pronunciation: [sɛ̃ ʁystis]; Occitan: Sent Rostesi) is a commune in the Haute-Garonne department in southwestern France.

== History ==
Saint-Rustice is famous for its ancient Roman mosaics which were discovered in 1833. The city takes its name from Rusticus, a bishop of Cahors, who was murdered in 630.

== Population ==
Historical population
Year	Pop.	±% p.a.
1968	230	—
1975	233	+0.19%
1982	371	+6.87%
1990	394	+0.75%
1999	425	+0.85%
2007	424	−0.03%
2012	451	+1.24%
2017	460	+0.40%
2023	439	−0.78%
Source: INSEE

== Sights ==
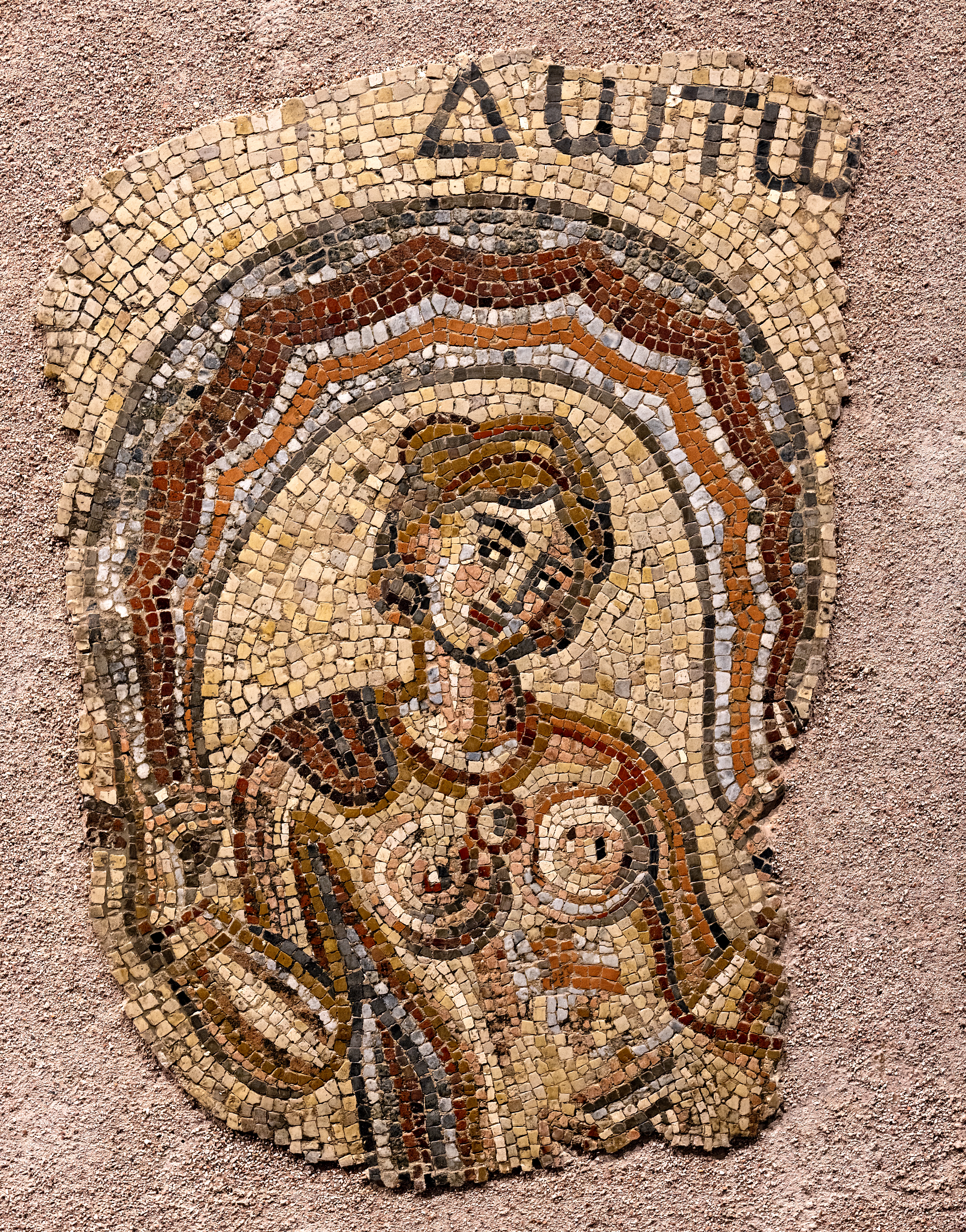
Gallo-Roman mosaic

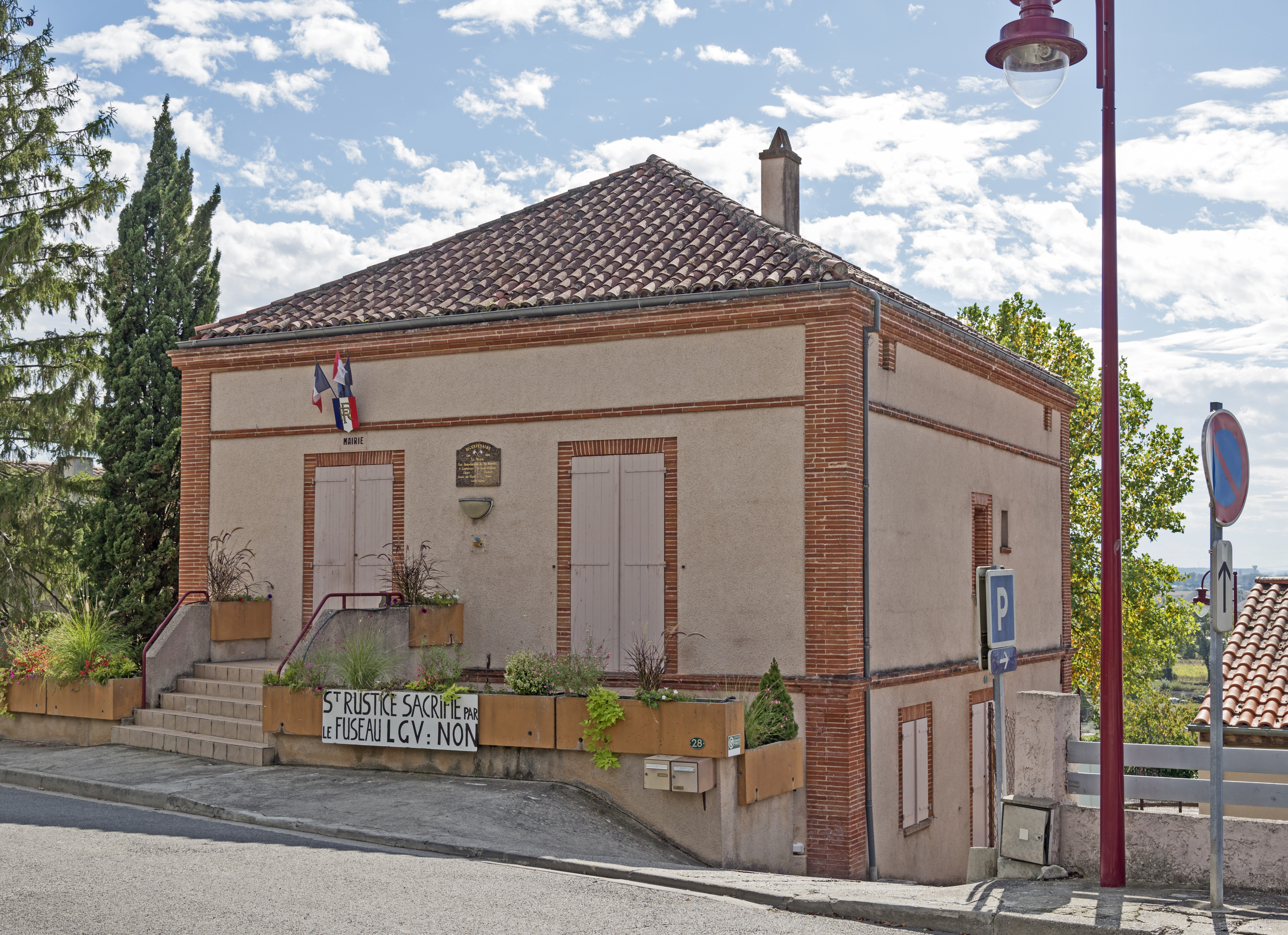
Town Hall

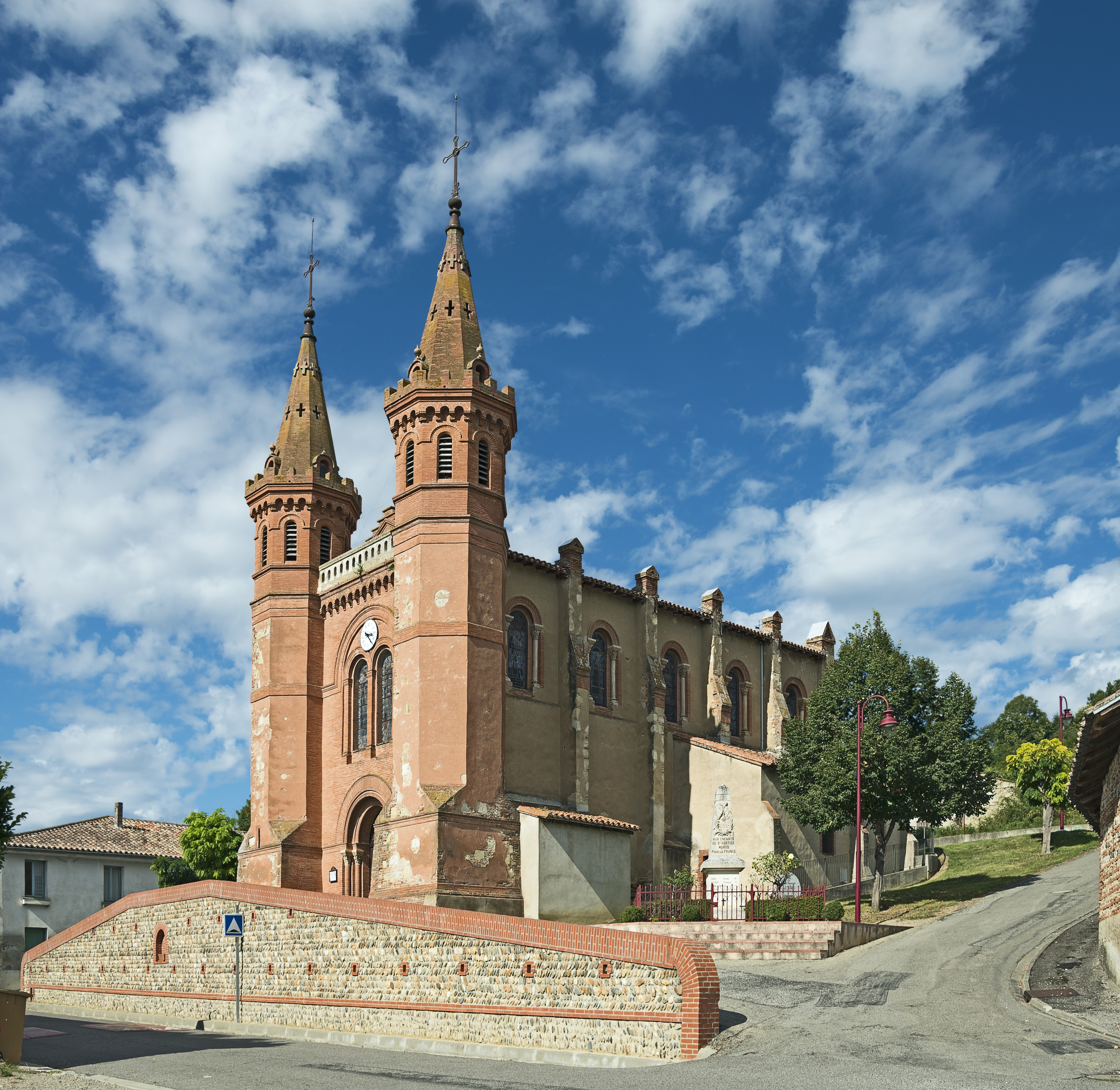
St. Peter Church

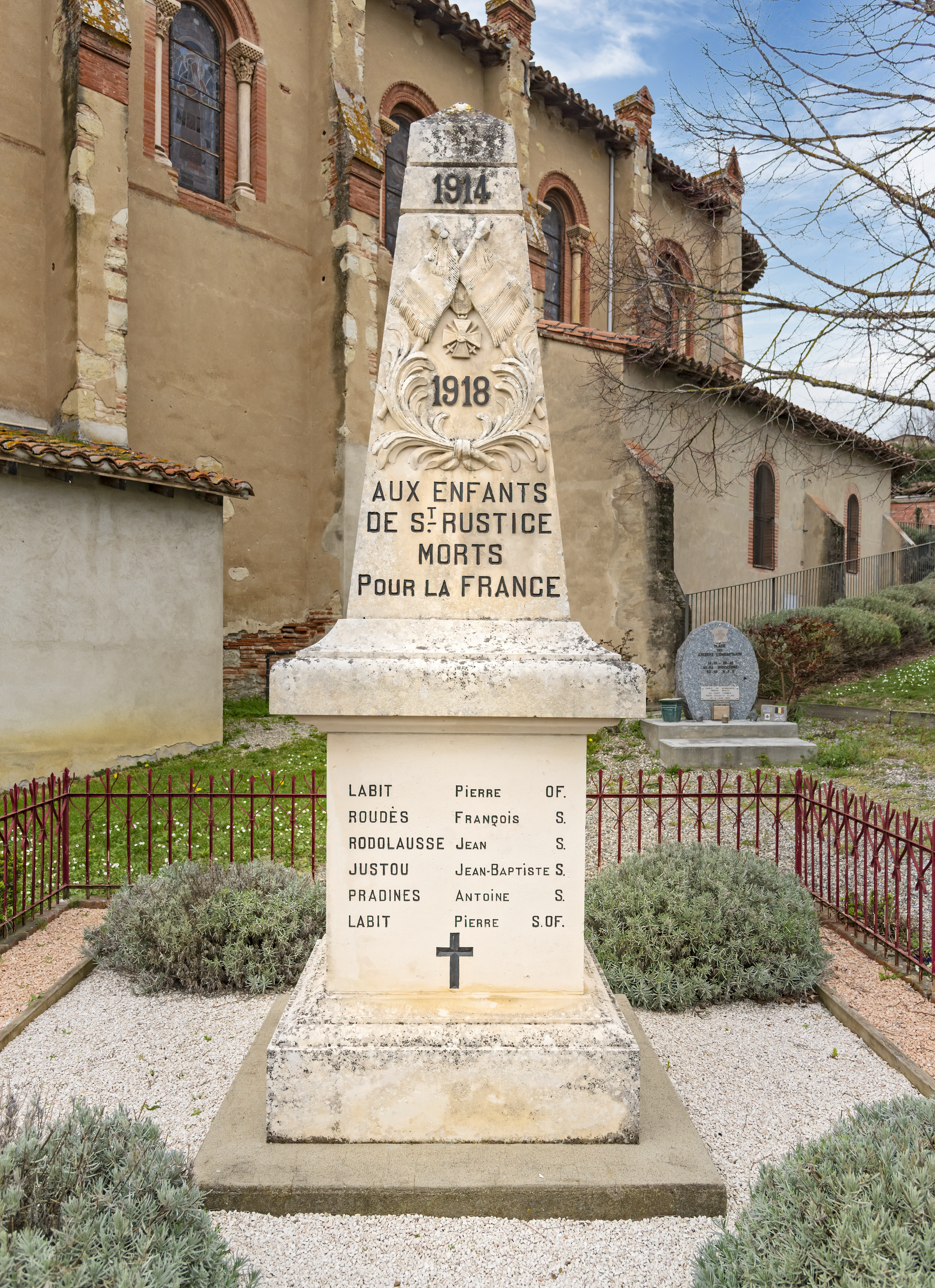
War memorial

== See also ==
- Communes of the Haute-Garonne department
