= Proupiary =

- Commune
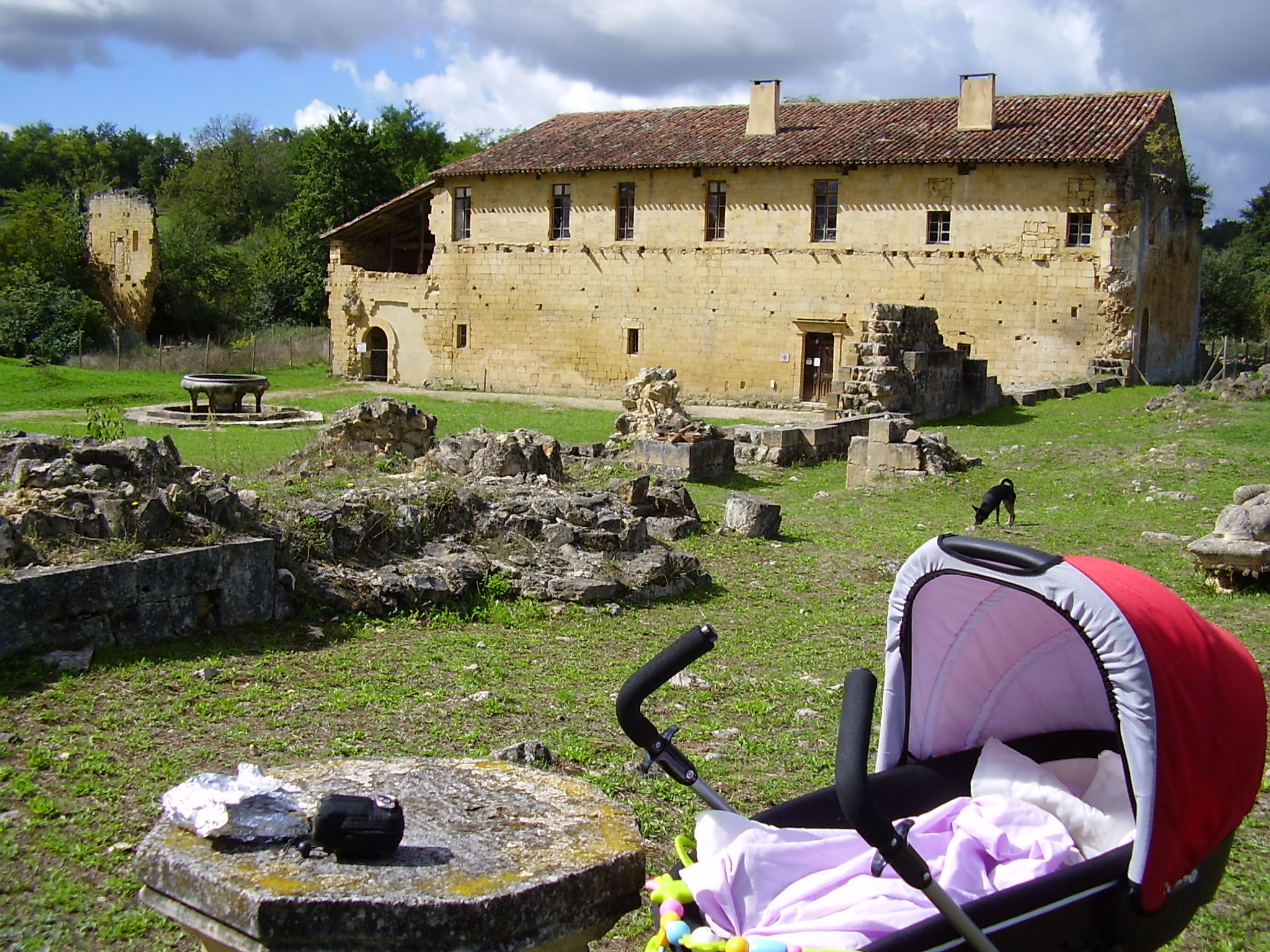
- Abbey of Bonnefont
- Location of Proupiary
- Location within France Location within Occitanie
- Coordinates: 43°09′39″N 0°51′45″E
- Country: France
- Region: Occitania
- Department: Haute-Garonne
- Arrondissement: Saint-Gaudens
- Canton: Bagnères-de-Luchon
- Intercommunality: Cagire Garonne Salat

Government
  - Mayor (2020–2026): Chantal Rivière
- Area^{1}: 4.95 km^{2} (1.91 sq mi)
- Elevation: 425 m (1,394 ft)
- Highest elevation: 483 m (1,585 ft)
- Lowest elevation: 340 m (1,120 ft)
- Population (2023): 61
  - Density: 12/km^{2} (32/sq mi)
- Time zone: UTC+01:00 (CET)
  - Summer (DST): UTC+02:00 (CEST)
- INSEE/Postal code: 31440 /31360
- ^{1} French Land Register data, which excludes lakes, ponds, glaciers > 1 km^{2} (0.386 sq mi or 247 acres) and river estuaries.

Proupiary (French pronunciation: [pʁupjaʁi]; Occitan: Propiari) is a commune in the Haute-Garonne department in southwestern France. The remains of the Bonnefont Abbey are situated in the commune.

== Population ==
Historical population
Year	Pop.	±% p.a.
1968	51	—
1975	50	−0.28%
1982	71	+5.14%
1990	53	−3.59%
1999	56	+0.61%
2007	66	+2.08%
2012	71	+1.47%
2017	73	+0.56%
2023	61	−2.95%
Source: INSEE

== See also ==
- Communes of the Haute-Garonne department
