= Miramont-de-Comminges =

- Commune
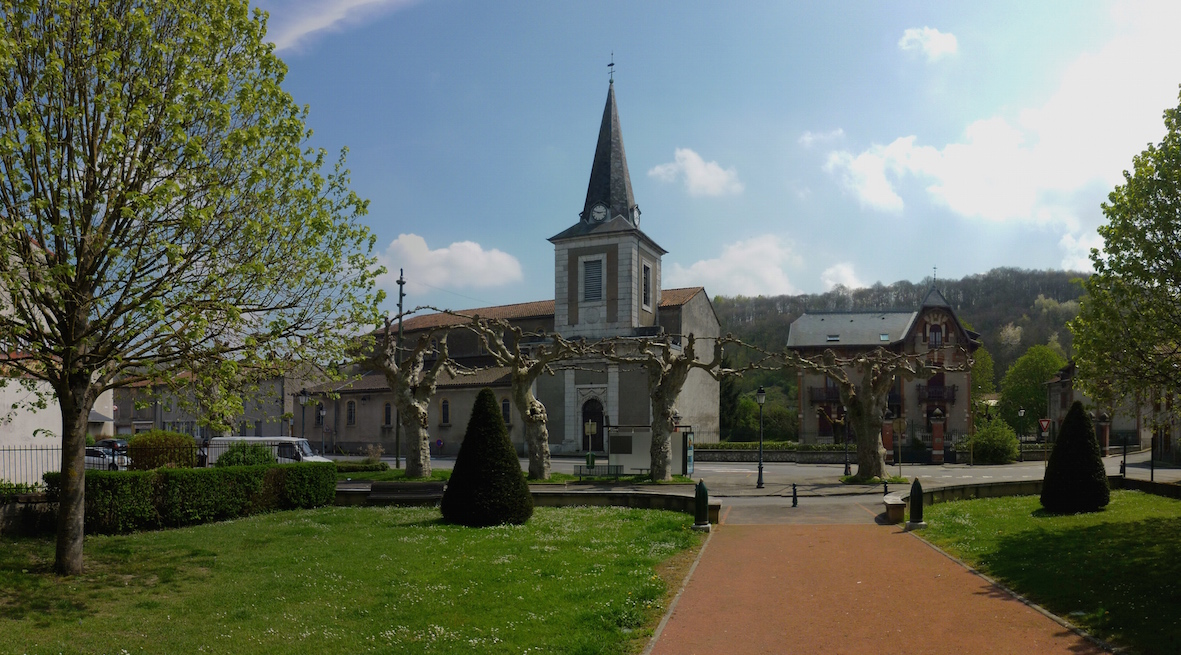
- The church in Miramont-de-Comminges
- Location of Miramont-de-Comminges
- Location within France Location within Occitanie
- Coordinates: 43°05′40″N 0°44′51″E
- Country: France
- Region: Occitania
- Department: Haute-Garonne
- Arrondissement: Saint-Gaudens
- Canton: Saint-Gaudens

Government
  - Mayor (2020–2026): Laure Vigneaux
- Area^{1}: 8.09 km^{2} (3.12 sq mi)
- Elevation: 388 m (1,273 ft)
- Highest elevation: 564 m (1,850 ft)
- Lowest elevation: 338 m (1,109 ft)
- Population (2023): 736
  - Density: 91.0/km^{2} (236/sq mi)
- Time zone: UTC+01:00 (CET)
  - Summer (DST): UTC+02:00 (CEST)
- INSEE/Postal code: 31344 /31800
- ^{1} French Land Register data, which excludes lakes, ponds, glaciers > 1 km^{2} (0.386 sq mi or 247 acres) and river estuaries.

Miramont-de-Comminges is a commune in the Haute-Garonne department in southwestern France.

== Population ==
Historical population
Year	Pop.	±% p.a.
1968	1,093	—
1975	1,123	+0.39%
1982	1,008	−1.53%
1990	922	−1.11%
1999	784	−1.79%
2007	869	+1.29%
2012	779	−2.16%
2017	780	+0.03%
2023	736	−0.96%
Source: INSEE

== See also ==
- Communes of the Haute-Garonne department
