= Villeneuve-de-Rivière =

- Commune
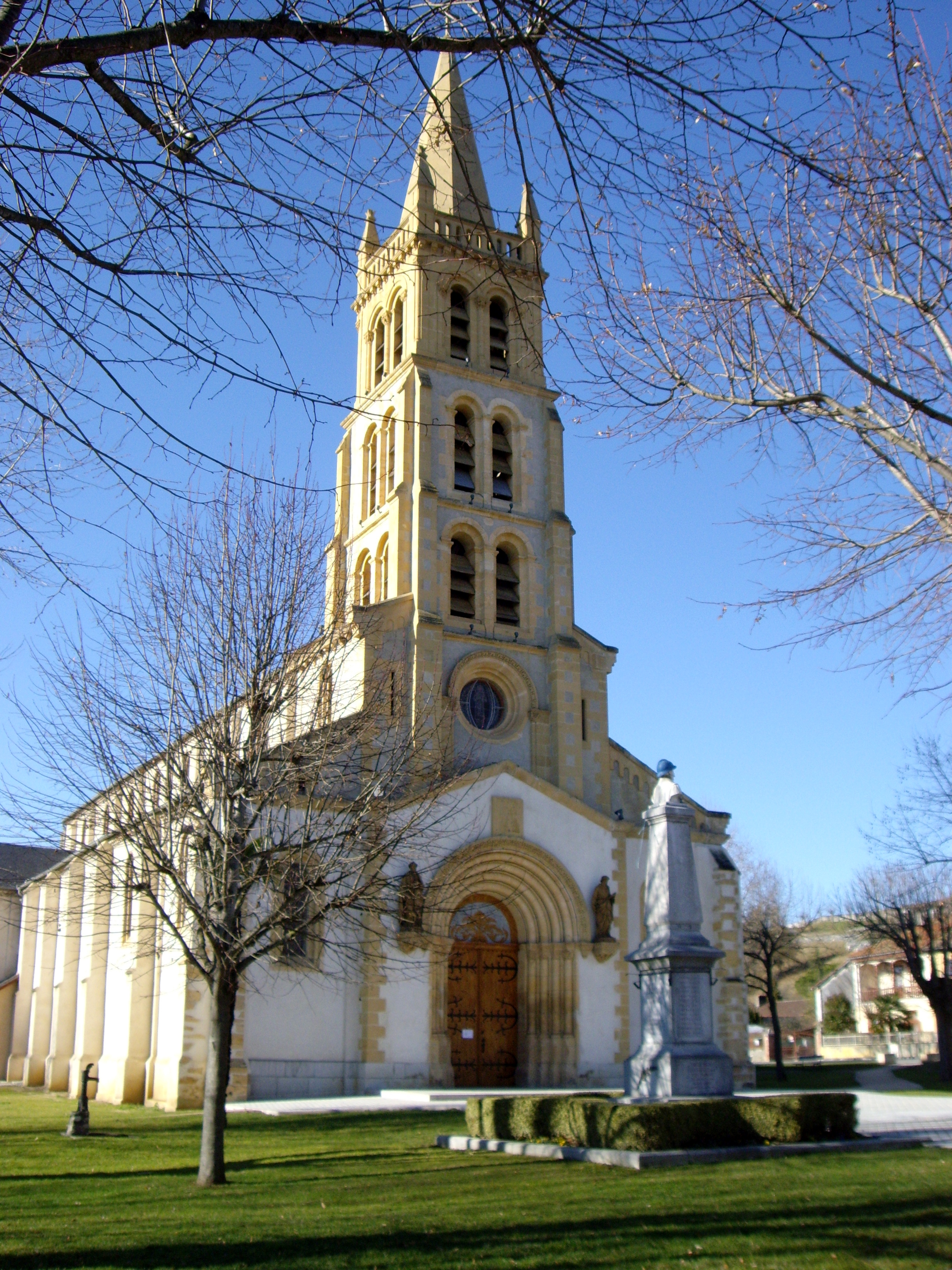
- The church in Villeneuve-de-Rivière
- Location of Villeneuve-de-Rivière
- Location within France Location within Occitanie
- Coordinates: 43°07′19″N 0°40′03″E
- Country: France
- Region: Occitania
- Department: Haute-Garonne
- Arrondissement: Saint-Gaudens
- Canton: Saint-Gaudens

Government
  - Mayor (2020–2026): Émilie Subra
- Area^{1}: 13.57 km^{2} (5.24 sq mi)
- Elevation: 382 m (1,253 ft)
- Highest elevation: 496 m (1,627 ft)
- Lowest elevation: 365 m (1,198 ft)
- Population (2023): 1,725
  - Density: 127.1/km^{2} (329.2/sq mi)
- Time zone: UTC+01:00 (CET)
  - Summer (DST): UTC+02:00 (CEST)
- INSEE/Postal code: 31585 /31800
- ^{1} French Land Register data, which excludes lakes, ponds, glaciers > 1 km^{2} (0.386 sq mi or 247 acres) and river estuaries.

Villeneuve-de-Rivière (French pronunciation: [vilnœv də ʁivjɛʁ]; Occitan: Vilanava d'Arribèra) is a commune in the Haute-Garonne department in southwestern France.

== Population ==
Historical population
Year	Pop.	±% p.a.
1968	886	—
1975	1,089	+2.99%
1982	1,273	+2.26%
1990	1,341	+0.65%
1999	1,360	+0.16%
2007	1,515	+1.36%
2012	1,702	+2.36%
2017	1,794	+1.06%
2023	1,725	−0.65%
Source: INSEE

== See also ==
- Communes of the Haute-Garonne department
