= Esparron, Haute-Garonne =

Esparron
- Commune
- Location of Esparron
- Location within France Location within Occitanie
- Coordinates: 43°15′54″N 0°48′22″E
- Country: France
- Region: Occitania
- Department: Haute-Garonne
- Arrondissement: Saint-Gaudens
- Canton: Cazères

Government
  - Mayor (2020–2026): André Massarin
- Area^{1}: 5.53 km^{2} (2.14 sq mi)
- Elevation: 350 m (1,150 ft)
- Highest elevation: 374 m (1,227 ft)
- Lowest elevation: 293 m (961 ft)
- Population (2023): 42
  - Density: 7.6/km^{2} (20/sq mi)
- Time zone: UTC+01:00 (CET)
  - Summer (DST): UTC+02:00 (CEST)
- INSEE/Postal code: 31172 /31420
- ^{1} French Land Register data, which excludes lakes, ponds, glaciers > 1 km^{2} (0.386 sq mi or 247 acres) and river estuaries.

Esparron (French pronunciation: [ɛspaʁɔ̃]) is a commune in the Haute-Garonne department in southwestern France.

== Population ==
Historical population
Year	Pop.	±% p.a.
1968	95	—
1975	71	−4.07%
1982	55	−3.58%
1990	46	−2.21%
1999	36	−2.69%
2007	46	+3.11%
2012	66	+7.49%
2017	57	−2.89%
2023	42	−4.96%
Source: INSEE

== See also ==
- Communes of the Haute-Garonne department
