= Lège =

- Commune
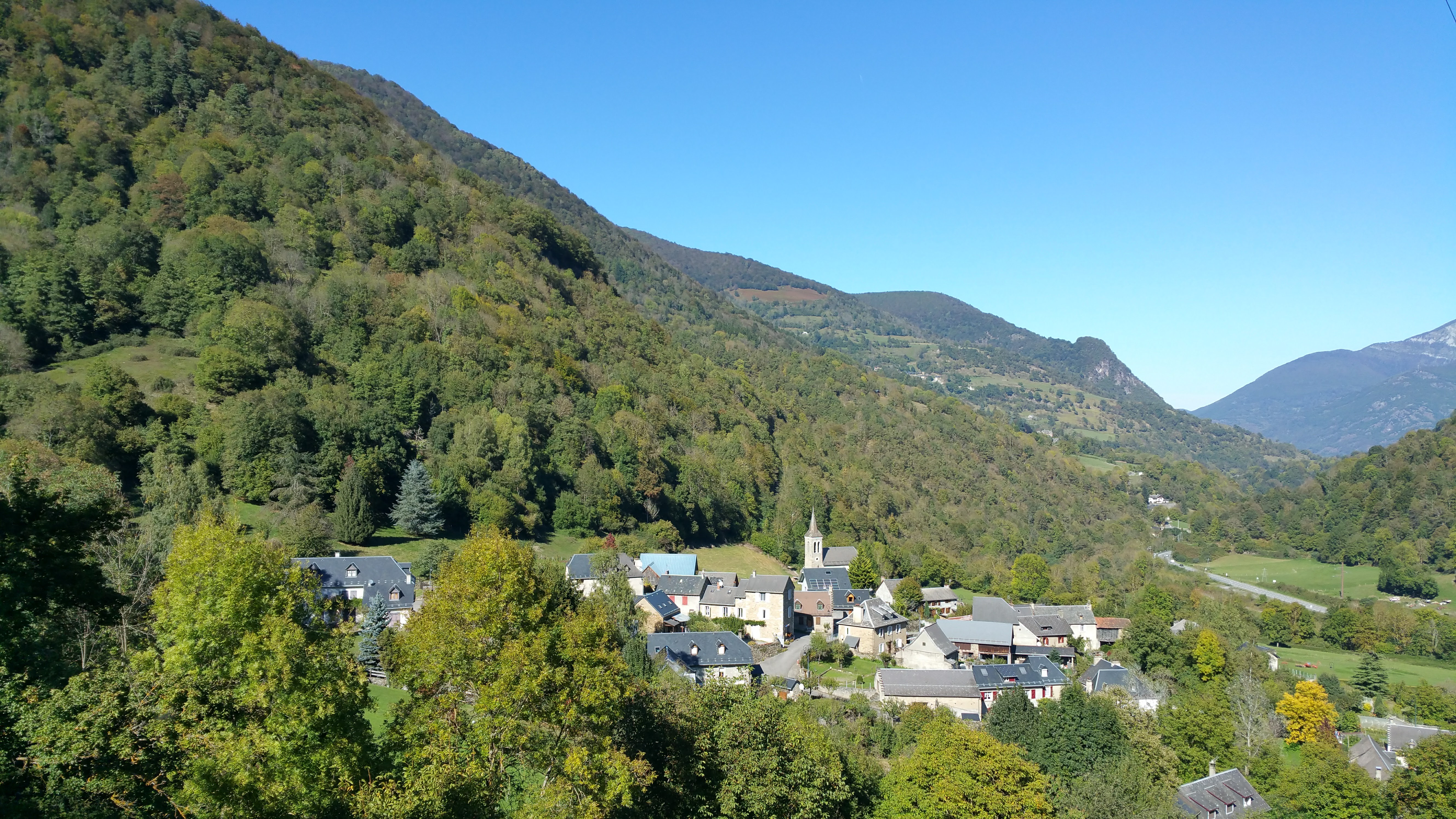
- A general view of Lège
- Location of Lège
- Location within France Location within Occitanie
- Coordinates: 42°52′41″N 0°36′42″E
- Country: France
- Region: Occitania
- Department: Haute-Garonne
- Arrondissement: Saint-Gaudens
- Canton: Bagnères-de-Luchon
- Intercommunality: Pyrénées Haut Garonnaises

Government
  - Mayor (2020–2026): François Martin
- Area^{1}: 2.72 km^{2} (1.05 sq mi)
- Elevation: 576 m (1,890 ft)
- Highest elevation: 1,740 m (5,710 ft)
- Lowest elevation: 560 m (1,840 ft)
- Population (2023): 32
  - Density: 12/km^{2} (30/sq mi)
- Time zone: UTC+01:00 (CET)
  - Summer (DST): UTC+02:00 (CEST)
- INSEE/Postal code: 31290 /31440
- ^{1} French Land Register data, which excludes lakes, ponds, glaciers > 1 km^{2} (0.386 sq mi or 247 acres) and river estuaries.

Lège (French pronunciation: [lɛʒ]; Occitan: Leja) is a commune in the Haute-Garonne department in southwestern France.

== Population ==
Historical population
Year	Pop.	±% p.a.
1968	72	—
1975	62	−2.11%
1982	39	−6.41%
1990	55	+4.39%
1999	39	−3.75%
2007	42	+0.93%
2012	43	+0.47%
2017	43	+0.00%
2023	32	−4.81%
Source: INSEE

== See also ==
- Communes of the Haute-Garonne department
