= Gurani =

Gurani may refer to:

== Places ==
- Gurani, a village in Pietroasa, Bihor County, Romania
- Gurani Rural District in Iran

== Other uses ==
- Gorani language, Western Iranian language

== See also ==
- Gorani (disambiguation)
- Guarani (disambiguation)
