= Nogaret =

- Commune
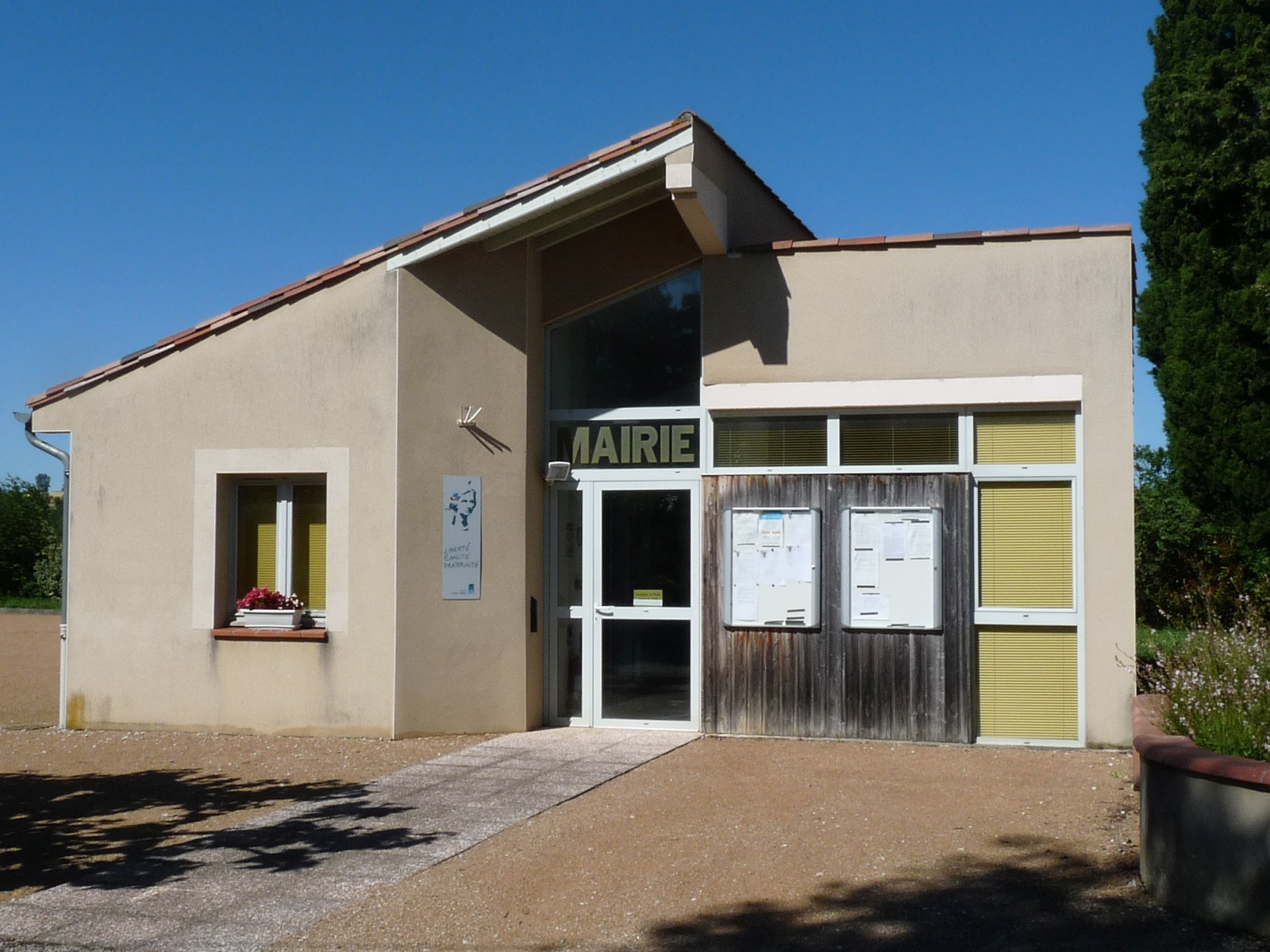
- The town hall in Nogaret

- Coat of arms
- Location of Nogaret
- Location within France Location within Occitanie
- Coordinates: 43°29′38″N 1°55′49″E
- Country: France
- Region: Occitania
- Department: Haute-Garonne
- Arrondissement: Toulouse
- Canton: Revel
- Intercommunality: CC aux sources du Canal du Midi

Government
  - Mayor (2020–2026): Judith Ardon Pernet
- Area^{1}: 4 km^{2} (1.5 sq mi)
- Elevation: 250 m (820 ft)
- Highest elevation: 273 m (896 ft)
- Lowest elevation: 188 m (617 ft)
- Population (2023): 96
  - Density: 24/km^{2} (62/sq mi)
- Time zone: UTC+01:00 (CET)
  - Summer (DST): UTC+02:00 (CEST)
- INSEE/Postal code: 31400 /31540
- ^{1} French Land Register data, which excludes lakes, ponds, glaciers > 1 km^{2} (0.386 sq mi or 247 acres) and river estuaries.

Nogaret (French pronunciation: [nɔɡaʁɛ]) is a commune in the Haute-Garonne department in southwestern France.

== Population ==
Historical population
Year	Pop.	±% p.a.
1968	96	—
1975	69	−4.61%
1982	69	+0.00%
1990	72	+0.53%
1999	78	+0.89%
2007	75	−0.49%
2012	73	−0.54%
2017	83	+2.60%
2023	96	+2.45%
Source: INSEE

== See also ==
- Guillaume de Nogaret
- Jean Louis de Nogaret de La Valette
- Communes of the Haute-Garonne department
