= Guran, Haute-Garonne =

Guran
- Commune
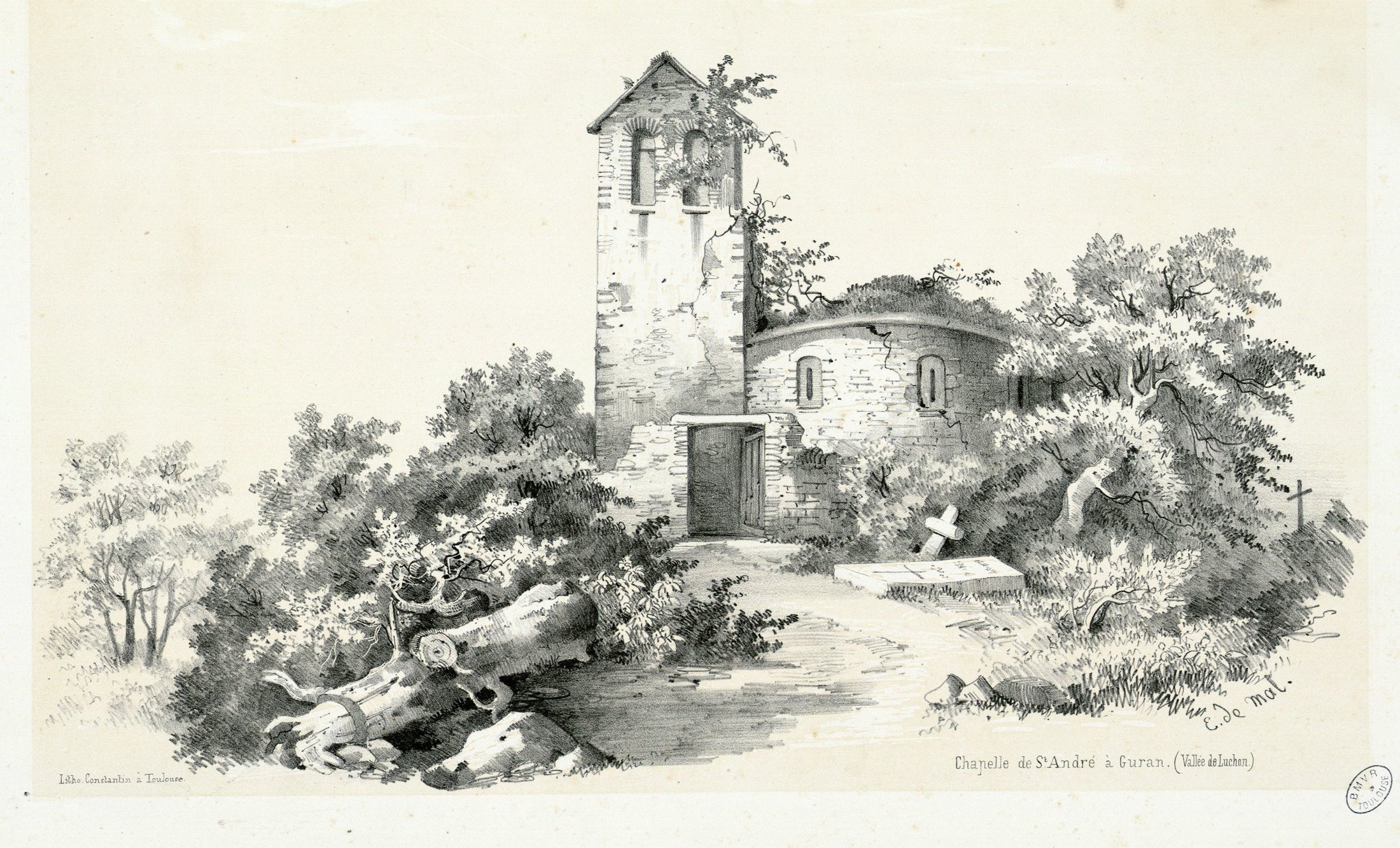
- Saint Andrews Chapel by Eugène de Malbos
- Location of Guran
- Location within France Location within Occitanie
- Coordinates: 42°53′27″N 0°37′01″E
- Country: France
- Region: Occitania
- Department: Haute-Garonne
- Arrondissement: Saint-Gaudens
- Canton: Bagnères-de-Luchon
- Intercommunality: Pyrénées Haut Garonnaises

Government
  - Mayor (2020–2026): Bernard Mora
- Area^{1}: 5.28 km^{2} (2.04 sq mi)
- Elevation: 646 m (2,119 ft)
- Highest elevation: 1,740 m (5,710 ft)
- Lowest elevation: 551 m (1,808 ft)
- Population (2023): 59
  - Density: 11/km^{2} (29/sq mi)
- Time zone: UTC+01:00 (CET)
  - Summer (DST): UTC+02:00 (CEST)
- INSEE/Postal code: 31235 /31440
- ^{1} French Land Register data, which excludes lakes, ponds, glaciers > 1 km^{2} (0.386 sq mi or 247 acres) and river estuaries.

Guran (French pronunciation: [ɡyʁɑ̃]) is a commune in the Haute-Garonne department in southwestern France.

== Population ==
Historical population
Year	Pop.	±% p.a.
1968	65	—
1975	56	−2.11%
1982	41	−4.36%
1990	30	−3.83%
1999	45	+4.61%
2007	55	+2.54%
2012	48	−2.69%
2017	44	−1.73%
2023	59	+5.01%
Source: INSEE

== See also ==
Communes of the Haute-Garonne department
