= Gorani, Konjic =

Gorani Горани
- Village
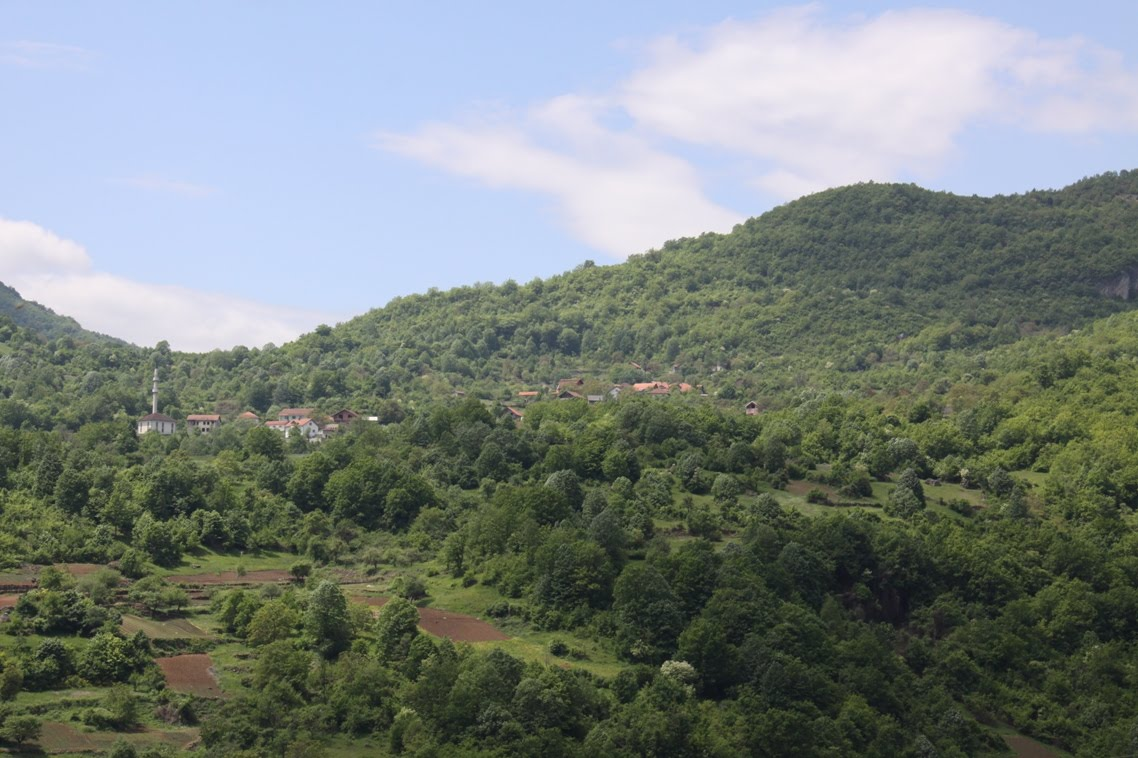

- Location within Bosnia and Herzegovina
- Coordinates: 43°44′54″N 17°48′14″E
- Country: Bosnia and Herzegovina
- Entity: Federation of Bosnia and Herzegovina
- Canton: Herzegovina-Neretva
- Municipality: Konjic

Area
  - Total: 2.04 sq mi (5.28 km^{2})

Population (2013)
  - Total: 189
  - Density: 92.7/sq mi (35.8/km^{2})
- Time zone: UTC+1 (CET)
  - Summer (DST): UTC+2 (CEST)

Gorani (Cyrillic: Горани) is a village in the municipality of Konjic, Bosnia and Herzegovina.

== Demographics ==
According to the 2013 census, its population was 189.

Ethnicity in 2013
Ethnicity	Number	Percentage
Bosniaks	186	98.4%
other/undeclared	3	1.6%
Total	189	100%
