= Geliguran =

Geliguran گلي گوران
- Village
- Location within Iran
- Coordinates: 28°51′26″N 56°44′58″E
- Country: Iran
- Province: Kerman
- County: Baft
- Bakhsh: Central
- Rural District: Dashtab

Population (2006)
  - Total: 119
- Time zone: UTC+3:30 (IRST)
  - Summer (DST): UTC+4:30 (IRDT)

Geliguran (Persian: گلي گوران, also Romanized as Gelīgūrān; also known as Golī Kūrān, Gūrān, Kolī Gūrān, Kolī Gūrūn, and Kooran) is a village in Dashtab Rural District, in the Central District of Baft County, Kerman Province, Iran. At the 2006 census, its population was 119, in 21 families.
