= Gorani, Visoko =

Gorani
- Village
- Location within Bosnia and Herzegovina
- Coordinates: 43.9581741°N 18.1488465°E
- Country: Bosnia and Herzegovina
- Entity: Federation of Bosnia and Herzegovina
- Canton: Zenica-Doboj
- Municipality: Visoko

Area
  - Total: 1.45 sq mi (3.76 km^{2})

Population (2013)
  - Total: 59
  - Density: 41/sq mi (16/km^{2})
- Time zone: UTC+1 (CET)
  - Summer (DST): UTC+2 (CEST)

Gorani is a village in the municipality of Visoko, Bosnia and Herzegovina.

== Demographics ==
According to the 2013 census, its population was 59.

Ethnicity in 2013
Ethnicity	Number	Percentage
Bosniaks	50	84.7%
other/undeclared	9	15.3%
Total	59	100%
