= Kurian-e Gowra =

Kurian-e Gowra كوريان گورا
- Village
- Location within Iran
- Coordinates: 34°34′16″N 46°45′24″E
- Country: Iran
- Province: Kermanshah
- County: Ravansar
- Bakhsh: Central
- Rural District: Hasanabad

Population (2006)
  - Total: 90
- Time zone: UTC+3:30 (IRST)
  - Summer (DST): UTC+4:30 (IRDT)

Kurian-e Gowra (Persian: كوريان گورا, also Romanized as Kūrīān-e Gowrā; also known as Gūrān-e Gowrā, Gūrīān-e Gorā, Gūrīān-e Gowrā, Gūrīān-e Gowreh, Gūrīān Gora, Gūrīyan-e Gūrā and Kūreyān Gowreh) is a village in Hasanabad Rural District, in the Central District of Ravansar County, Kermanshah Province, Iran. At the 2006 census, its population was 90, in 21 families.
