= Gurvan-e Bozorg =

Gurvan-e Bozorg گوروان بزرگ
- Village
- Location within Iran
- Coordinates: 38°21′00″N 47°22′00″E
- Country: Iran
- Province: East Azerbaijan
- County: Ahar
- Bakhsh: Central
- Rural District: Qeshlaq

Population (2006)
  - Total: 92
- Time zone: UTC+3:30 (IRST)
  - Summer (DST): UTC+4:30 (IRDT)

Gurvan-e Bozorg (Persian: گوروان بزرگ, also Romanized as Gūrvān-e Bozorg; also known as Gūzvān-e Bozorg) is a village in Qeshlaq Rural District, in the Central District of Ahar County, East Azerbaijan Province, Iran. At the 2006 census, its population was 92, in 16 families.
