= Göran Johansson =

Göran Johansson can refer to:

- Göran Johansson (politician) (1945–2014), Swedish politician
- Göran Johansson (rower) (born 1957) (1957–2021), Swedish Olympic rower
- Göran Johansson (speed skater, born 1941), Swedish Olympic speed skater
- Göran Johansson (speed skater, born 1958), Swedish Olympic speed skater
