= Göran Larsson =

Göran Larsson may refer to:

- Göran Larsson (theologian) (born 1949)
- Göran Larsson (swimmer) (1932–1989)
