= Boutx =

- Commune
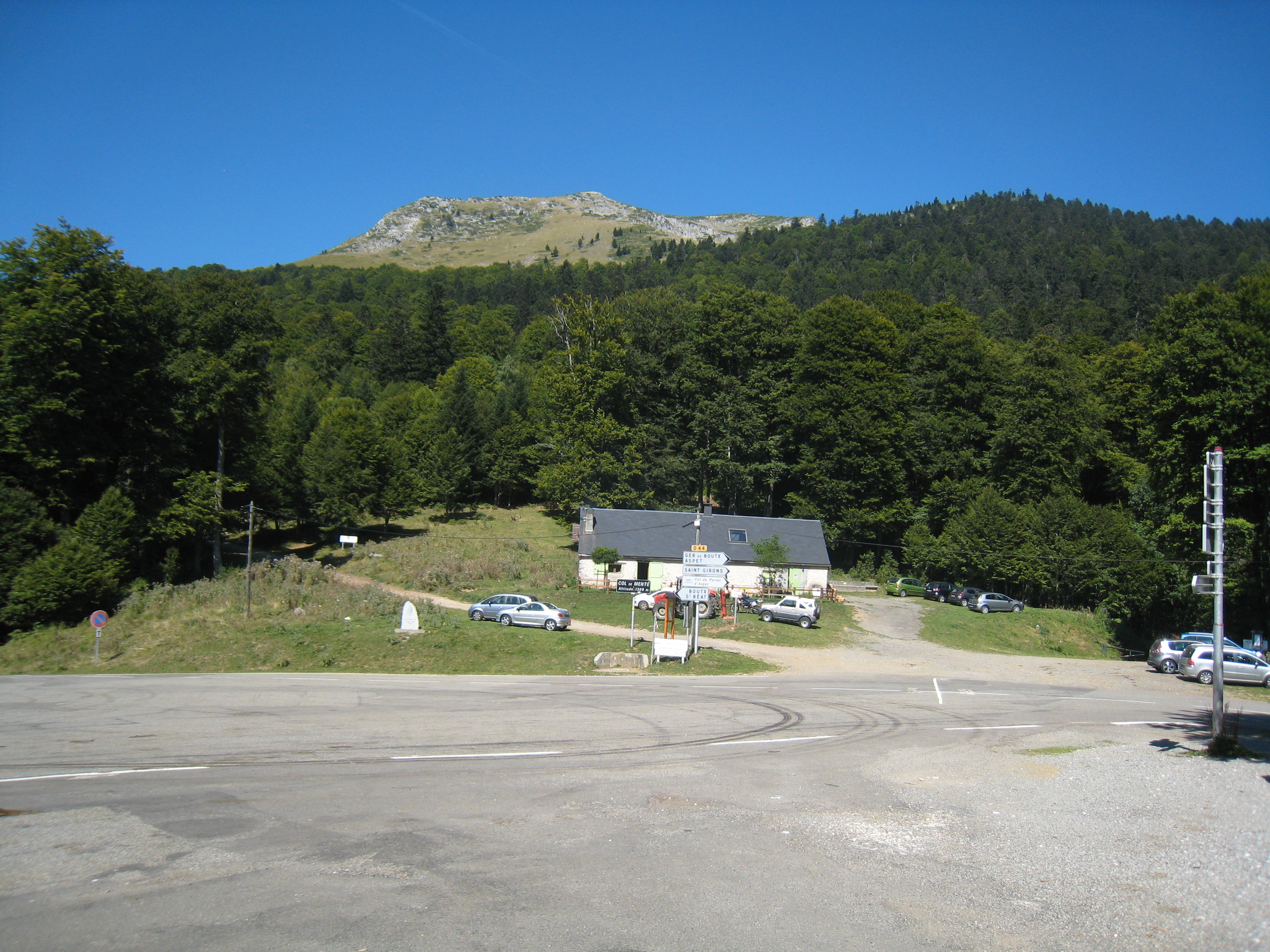
- The summit of the Col de Mente in Boutx
- Location of Boutx
- Location within France Location within Occitanie
- Coordinates: 42°55′07″N 0°42′59″E
- Country: France
- Region: Occitania
- Department: Haute-Garonne
- Arrondissement: Saint-Gaudens
- Canton: Bagnères-de-Luchon
- Intercommunality: Pyrénées Haut Garonnaises

Government
  - Mayor (2023–2026): Fabien Melazzini
- Area^{1}: 47.28 km^{2} (18.25 sq mi)
- Elevation: 680 m (2,230 ft)
- Highest elevation: 1,850 m (6,070 ft)
- Lowest elevation: 560 m (1,840 ft)
- Population (2023): 249
  - Density: 5.27/km^{2} (13.6/sq mi)
- Time zone: UTC+01:00 (CET)
  - Summer (DST): UTC+02:00 (CEST)
- INSEE/Postal code: 31085 /31440
- ^{1} French Land Register data, which excludes lakes, ponds, glaciers > 1 km^{2} (0.386 sq mi or 247 acres) and river estuaries.

Boutx (French pronunciation: [buts]; Occitan: Bots) is a commune in the Haute-Garonne department in southwestern France. In 1974 it absorbed the former communes Argut-Dessus and Couledoux.

== Population ==
Historical population
Year	Pop.	±% p.a.
1968	346	—
1975	304	−1.83%
1982	362	+2.53%
1990	324	−1.38%
1999	259	−2.46%
2007	269	+0.47%
2012	250	−1.45%
2017	244	−0.48%
2023	249	+0.34%
Source: INSEE

== See also ==
- Communes of the Haute-Garonne department
