= Arlos =

- Commune
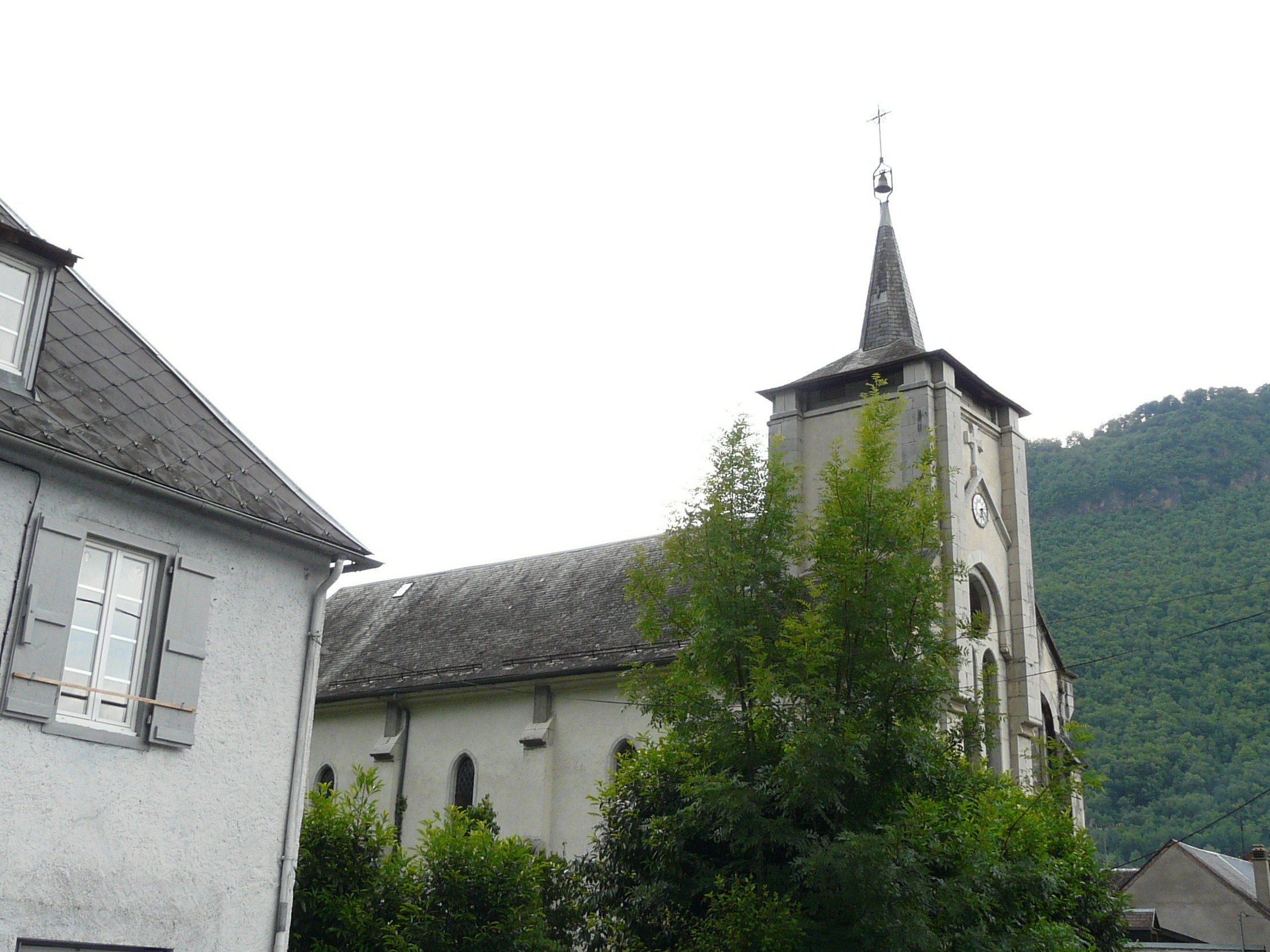
- The church in Arlos
- Location of Arlos
- Location within France Location within Occitanie
- Coordinates: 42°53′32″N 0°42′15″E
- Country: France
- Region: Occitania
- Department: Haute-Garonne
- Arrondissement: Saint-Gaudens
- Canton: Bagnères-de-Luchon
- Intercommunality: CC Pyrénées Haut-Garonnaises

Government
  - Mayor (2020–2026): Jean-Marc Ribis
- Area^{1}: 9.41 km^{2} (3.63 sq mi)
- Elevation: 523 m (1,716 ft)
- Highest elevation: 2,165 m (7,103 ft)
- Lowest elevation: 509 m (1,670 ft)
- Population (2023): 106
  - Density: 11.3/km^{2} (29.2/sq mi)
- Time zone: UTC+01:00 (CET)
  - Summer (DST): UTC+02:00 (CEST)
- INSEE/Postal code: 31017 /31440
- ^{1} French Land Register data, which excludes lakes, ponds, glaciers > 1 km^{2} (0.386 sq mi or 247 acres) and river estuaries.

Arlos is a commune in the Haute-Garonne department in southwestern France.

== Population ==
Historical population
Year	Pop.	±% p.a.
1968	172	—
1975	145	−2.41%
1982	140	−0.50%
1990	104	−3.65%
1999	88	−1.84%
2007	89	+0.14%
2012	93	+0.88%
2017	100	+1.46%
2023	106	+0.98%
Source: INSEE

== See also ==
- Communes of the Haute-Garonne department
