= Fos, Haute-Garonne =

Fos
- Commune
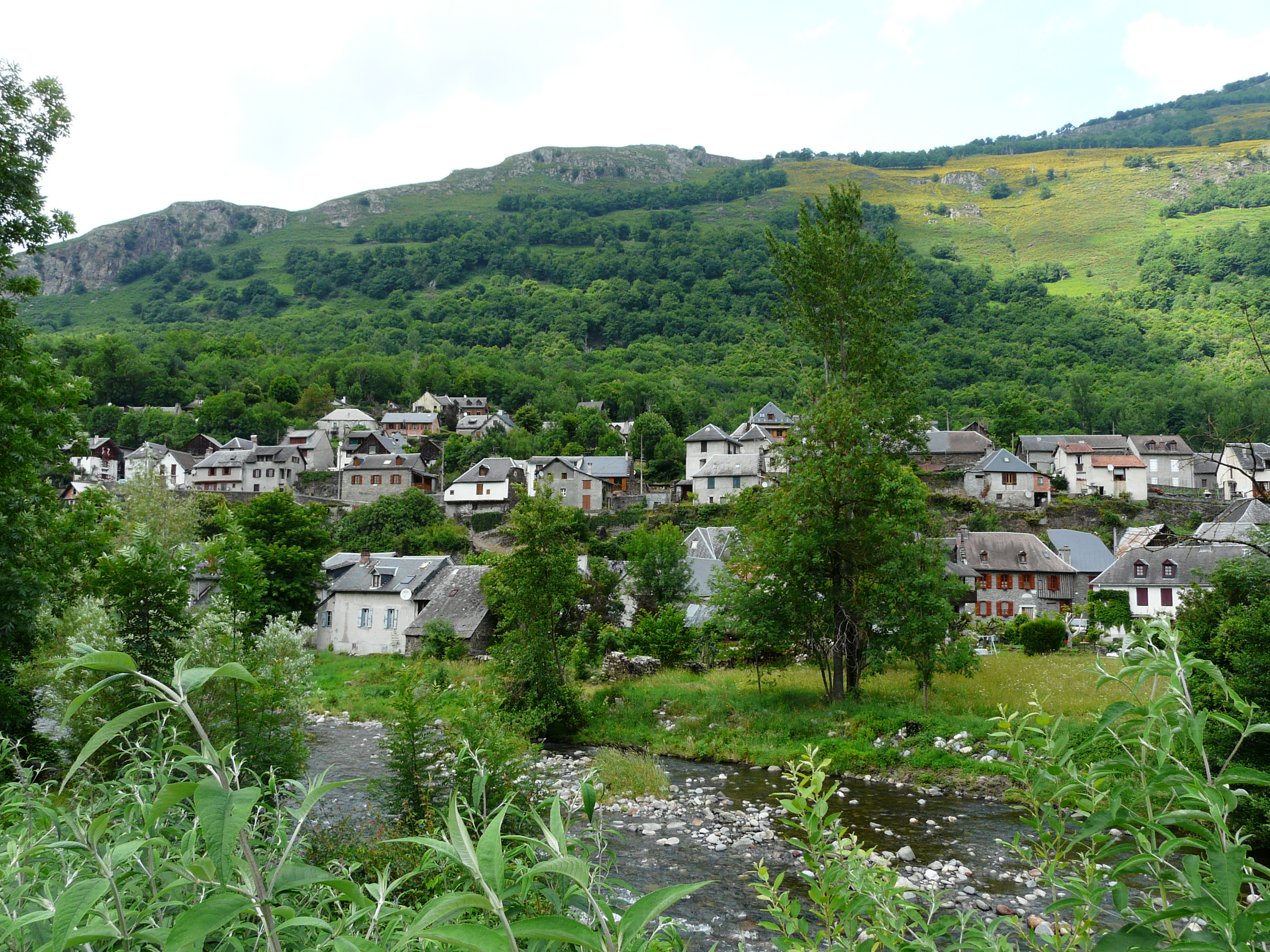
- A general view of Fos
- Location of Fos
- Location within France Location within Occitanie
- Coordinates: 42°52′27″N 0°44′13″E
- Country: France
- Region: Occitania
- Department: Haute-Garonne
- Arrondissement: Saint-Gaudens
- Canton: Bagnères-de-Luchon
- Intercommunality: Pyrénées Haut Garonnaises

Government
  - Mayor (2020–2026): Pascal Penetro
- Area^{1}: 18.17 km^{2} (7.02 sq mi)
- Elevation: 543 m (1,781 ft)
- Highest elevation: 2,024 m (6,640 ft)
- Lowest elevation: 520 m (1,710 ft)
- Population (2023): 248
  - Density: 13.6/km^{2} (35.4/sq mi)
- Time zone: UTC+01:00 (CET)
  - Summer (DST): UTC+02:00 (CEST)
- INSEE/Postal code: 31190 /31440
- ^{1} French Land Register data, which excludes lakes, ponds, glaciers > 1 km^{2} (0.386 sq mi or 247 acres) and river estuaries.

Fos (French pronunciation: [fɔs]; Occitan: Hòs) is a commune in the Haute-Garonne department in southwestern France.

== Population ==
Historical population
Year	Pop.	±% p.a.
1968	558	—
1975	381	−5.30%
1982	351	−1.16%
1990	319	−1.19%
1999	272	−1.76%
2007	253	−0.90%
2012	248	−0.40%
2017	237	−0.90%
2023	248	+0.76%
Source: INSEE

== See also ==
- GR 10 (France)
- Communes of the Haute-Garonne department
