= Goran (Kurdish name) =

Kurdish name

- Pronunciation: Gô•rân
- Gender: Male

Origin
- Origin: Kurdish
- Meaning: Goran Region, music, mountains
- Region of origin: Kurdistan

Other names
- Related names: Guran, Gûran

Goran (also Gûran) (Kurdish: گۆران) is a Kurdish name commonly used for males in the geographical region of Kurdistan and by Kurdish people worldwide. The name is also sometimes a surname.

Goran is not to be confused with the Kurdish word, Gorran, which means change and is also the name of a Kurdish political faction in Iraq.

== Origin and Meaning ==
In Kurdish, Gorani may refer to the Gorani language spoken by several millions of ethnic Kurds, or the geographical subregions of Hewraman and Garmian situated in the southeastern part of Kurdistan. In this context, the name Goran means someone who is of the Gorani-speakers or Gorani regions. The origins of the name are unclear but some scholars believe the name originates from the Avestan word gairi meaning mountain, and in modern Kurdish language, "Goran" also means highlander or mountaineer. The name has the same meaning in Slavic languages.

In Kurdish, gorani also means music.

== First name ==
- Goran Kamil, a well known Kurdish musician from Iraqi Kurdistan who is highly skilled in adapting the oud instrument to modern and traditional Kurdish music.

== Surname ==
- Abdulla Goran, a 20th-century late Kurdish writer and poet from Iraqi Kurdistan who is regarded by Kurds as the father of modern Kurdish literature.
