= Gurvan-e Kuchak =

Gurvan-e Kuchak گوروان كوچك
- Village
- Location within Iran
- Coordinates: 38°22′08″N 47°23′01″E
- Country: Iran
- Province: East Azerbaijan
- County: Ahar
- Bakhsh: Central
- Rural District: Qeshlaq

Population (2006)
  - Total: 15
- Time zone: UTC+3:30 (IRST)
  - Summer (DST): UTC+4:30 (IRDT)

Gurvan-e Kuchak (Persian: گوروان كوچك, also Romanized as Gūrvān-e Kūchak; also known as Gūrān and Gūzvān-e Kūchak) is a village in Qeshlaq Rural District, in the Central District of Ahar County, East Azerbaijan Province, Iran. At the 2006 census, its population was 15, in 5 families.
