= Taï =

- Town, sub-prefecture, and commune
- Location in Ivory Coast
- Coordinates: 5°52′N 7°27′W
- Country: Ivory Coast
- District: Montagnes
- Region: Cavally
- Department: Taï

Population (2014)
  - Total: 31,928
- Time zone: UTC+0 (GMT)

Taï is a town in southwestern Ivory Coast. It is a sub-prefecture of and the seat of Taï Department in Cavally Region, Montagnes District. Taï is also a commune. The town is between Taï National Park and the Cavally River. The river—which is the border with Liberia—is less than two kilometres south of the town. Previously, Taï was a sub-prefecture of the Guiglo Department; Taï Department was created on 22 March 2013.

Taï is the stronghold of two indigenous ethnic groups: Oubi and Dao. The Oubi are an ethnic group belonging to the group of Krou people. They are found in the commune of Taï and in ten villages south of it, such as the villages of Gouléako 1, Gouléako 2, Paulé-Oula, Diéré-Oula, Port-Gentil, Tiolé-Oula, Sakré and Ziriglo. The Dao, meanwhile, are Guéré (Wé) who are also part of the large family Krou. The Dao are grouped in two villages near the town of Taï going north: the villages of Daobly and Ponan.

There are also other Ivorian ethnic groups such as Malinke, Baoulé, Sénoufos and Dans as well as West African nationals such as Malians, Bukinabés, Guineans, Liberians Nigeriens and Mauritanians.

== Climate ==
Taï's climate is hot and humid throughout the year with temperatures averaging around 26 °C. The climate is divided into four seasons:

- A long rainy season from March–April to mid-July when moist winds from the Atlantic Ocean cause numerous thunderstorms and heavy rainfall.
- A short dry season in mid-July to September where rainfall are rare, but the sky is heavily overcast.
- A small rainy season from September to November with little rain.
- A long dry season from December to February–March including a period in December that is characterized by a great freshness at night and in the morning, partly due to the northeast trade winds called Harmattan.

== Politics and administration ==
The current mayor of the city of Taï is Mr. BAYALLA Kouyé Maya Hippolyte. (Mr. GNONKONTÉ Gnessoa Désiré being the precedent).

The current deputy of Taï is Mr. GNONKONTÉ Gnessoa Désiré. (Mr. GNONKONTÉ Gnessoa Désiré being reelected).

The current senator of Taï is Mr. DEH Paul.

The current president of the regional council of Taï is Mme. OULOTO Anne Désirée. (Mr. SARR Bohé Marius Mélaine Dégbahoua being the precedent after the defunct Mr. BANZIO Dagobert).

The current prefect of the department of Taï is Mr. BAKAYOKO Mamadou (Mr. SIBA N'Guessan Konan Édouard and Mr. Aka Kouassi Bio being the precedent).

The present sub-prefect of Taï is Mr. ZAN BI Goré Adolphe.

The current sub-prefect of Zagné is Mr. OUATTARA Mory.

== Economy ==
The local economy is based primarily on agriculture and livestock. Agriculture: Hevea, Cocoa, Coffee, Colatier, Rice, Corn, Cassava, Plantain Bananas, Sweet Bananas, Yam, Taro, Potato, Eggplant, Chili, Okra, Lettuce and Bean. Traditional breeding: Cattle, Sheep, Goat, Pig, Poultry. Traditional fishing and fish farming.

=== Ecotourism and sustainable tourism ===
==== Nature and culture: a community-based ecotourism project ====
Being at the gates of the famous Taï National Park, a community-based ecotourism project has been developed in the town that offers a range of activities based on nature and culture. The partners of this community based ecotourism and sustainable development project are the Wild Chimpanzee Foundation (WCF), the town of Taï, and the OIPR (Office Ivorien des Parcs et Réserves).

==== Ecomuseum ====
Built at the end of 2012 and opened in June 2014, the eco-museum, located at the entry of the town of Taï, acts as a reception center to accompany visitors throughout their stay in Taï and within Taï National Park. The eco-museum also offers a retrospective of 34 years of studies on the "nut-cracking" chimpanzees of Taï National Park. The building is meant to be a vector of transmission of the natural and cultural heritage of the region by raising awareness to young people and adults through presentations, diffusions of documentaries, fun and educational games and to actively support local crafts (exhibition and sale of handicrafts).

==== Unusual Accommodation and Solidarity Tourism in the village of Gouléako 1 ====
The village of Gouléako 1 (also called Trois Cailloux) is south of Taï about 10 minutes by car. This village is part of the villages of the Oubi ethnic group of the Krou family. As part of the community-based ecotourism project, the village of Gouléako 1 and its inhabitants with the help of Mr. Thierry FABBIAN, (ecotourism coordinator for the Wild Chimpanzee Foundation) have mobilized to offer authentic tourism activities inspired by true Oubi traditions. In addition, a traditional ecolodge made up of round banco huts offers tourists a very comfortable accommodation. The unusual lodge in Gouléako village 1 is run by a group of women.

==== Taï National Park ====
Taï National Park, with an area of 5,400 km, is the last great forest blocks of primary tropical forest of West Africa. It is extended to the north by the N'Zo Wildlife reserve. Classified as a Biosphere Reserve in 1978 and as World Heritage Site in 1981 by UNESCO, Taï National Park has a high rate of endemism at both plants and animals level. More than 200 species of plants in the park are endemic for West Africa as well as important mammals such as pygmy hippopotamus, Jentink and Ogilby duikers, several species of monkeys unique for the region and nearly 24 species of birds. Taï National Park is also home to one of the largest population of chimpanzees, in West Africa (Pan troglodytes verus) famous for their unique behaviour that make them a special population interesting scientifically and valuable for conservation.

The majority of the territory of Taï sub-prefecture is located within the boundaries of the park.

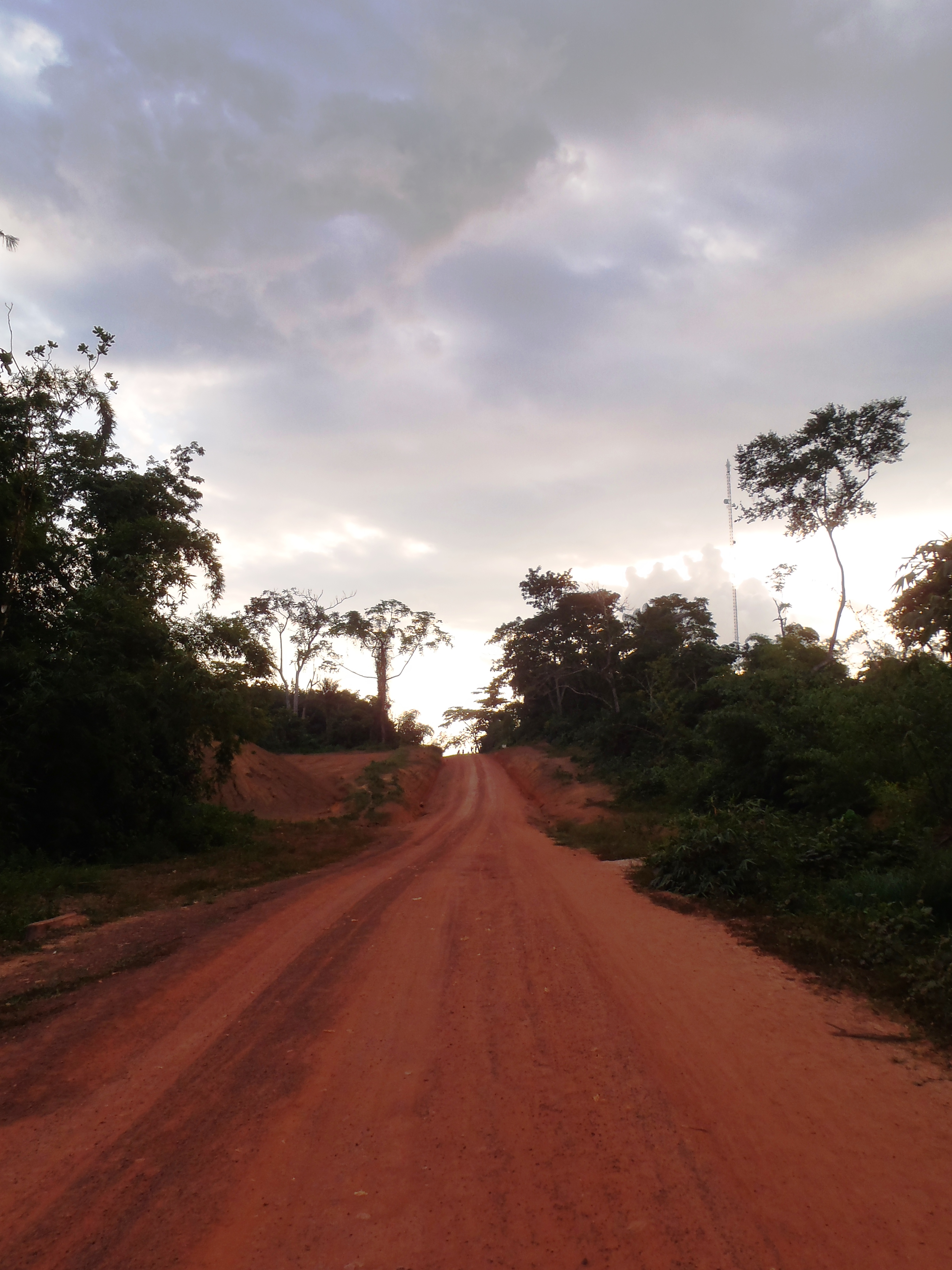
Road to Taï

== Nearby cities ==
- Zagné (north)
- Guiglo (north)
- Para (south)
- Djouroutou (south)

== Nearby villages ==
=== South ===
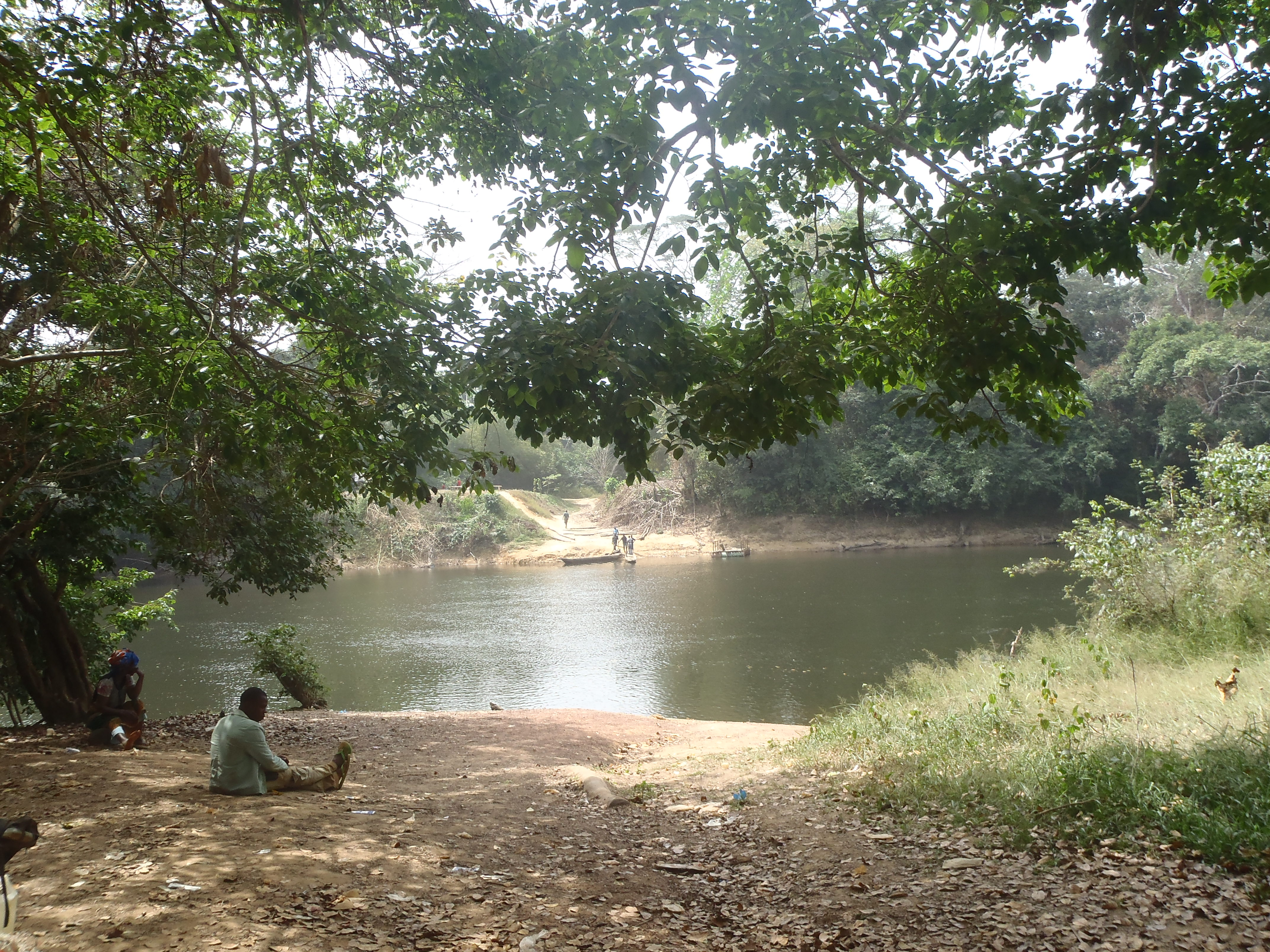
Taï, commune of Côte d'Ivoire. The Liberian border at the River Cavally

- Kouadiokro
- Gouléako 1 ou Trois Cailloux
- Gouléako 2
- Pauléoula
- Diéré-Oula
- Port-Gentil
- Tiéolé-Oula
- Sakré
- Ziriglo

=== North ===
- Daobly
- Ponan
- Gahably
- Zaïpobly
- Kéïbly
- Djidoubaye
- Goulégui-Bèouè
- Tienkoula
- Vodelobly

=== In Liberia (on the other side of the border) ===
- Tempo (west)

== Twin towns ==
Taï is twinned with:

- Lure (France)
