= Bohobli =

- Village
- Location in Ivory Coast
- Coordinates: 6°28′N 8°22′W
- Country: Ivory Coast
- District: Montagnes
- Region: Cavally
- Department: Toulépleu
- Sub-prefecture: Méo
- Time zone: UTC+0 (GMT)

Bohobli is a village in the far west of Ivory Coast. It is in the sub-prefecture of Méo, Toulépleu Department, Cavally Region, Montagnes District. The village is five kilometres east of the border with Liberia.

Bohobli was a commune until March 2012, when it became one of 1,126 communes nationwide that were abolished.
