= Pauléoula =

Pauléoula Poléoula
- Village
- Location in Ivory Coast
- Coordinates: 5°49′N 7°24′W
- Country: Ivory Coast
- District: Montagnes
- Region: Cavally
- Department: Taï
- Sub-prefecture: Taï
- Time zone: UTC+0 (GMT)

Pauléoula (also spelled Poléoula) is a village in the far west of Ivory Coast. It is in the sub-prefecture of Taï, Taï Department, Cavally Region, Montagnes District. The village is just over three kilometres east of the Cavally River, which is the border with Liberia.

Pauléoula was a commune until March 2012, when it became one of 1,126 communes nationwide that were abolished.

The original population of Pauléoula consisted mostly of members of the Oubi ethnic group, a small subgroup of the Krahn or Guéré people.
A few kilometers east of Pauléoula, within the boundaries of the Taï National Park, lies a small research centre, the 'Institut d'Écologie Tropicale'. It was a lonely house in the forest, not far from this institute, where the Swiss scientist Christophe Boesch in the 1980s conducted his famous research on the behaviour of tool-using Chimpanzees. Later, between 2008 and 2012, the movie Chimpanzee was filmed here, under difficult conditions, and with Boesch as principal scientific consultant.
