= Kéibly =

- Village
- Location in Ivory Coast
- Coordinates: 6°0′N 7°29′W
- Country: Ivory Coast
- District: Montagnes
- Region: Cavally
- Department: Taï
- Sub-prefecture: Zagné
- Time zone: UTC+0 (GMT)

Kéibly is a village in western Ivory Coast. It is in the sub-prefecture of Zagné, Taï Department, Cavally Region, Montagnes District.

Kéibly was a commune until March 2012, when it became one of 1,126 communes nationwide that were abolished.
