= Ké-Bouébo =

- Village
- Location in Ivory Coast
- Coordinates: 6°38′N 8°12′W
- Country: Ivory Coast
- District: Montagnes
- Region: Cavally
- Department: Bloléquin
- Sub-prefecture: Doké
- Time zone: UTC+0 (GMT)

Ké-Bouébo is a village in western Ivory Coast. It is in the sub-prefecture of Doké, Bloléquin Department, Cavally Region, Montagnes District.

Ké-Bouébo was a commune until March 2012, when it became one of 1,126 communes nationwide that were abolished.
