= Dagobert Banzio =

Ivorian politician (1957 – 2017)

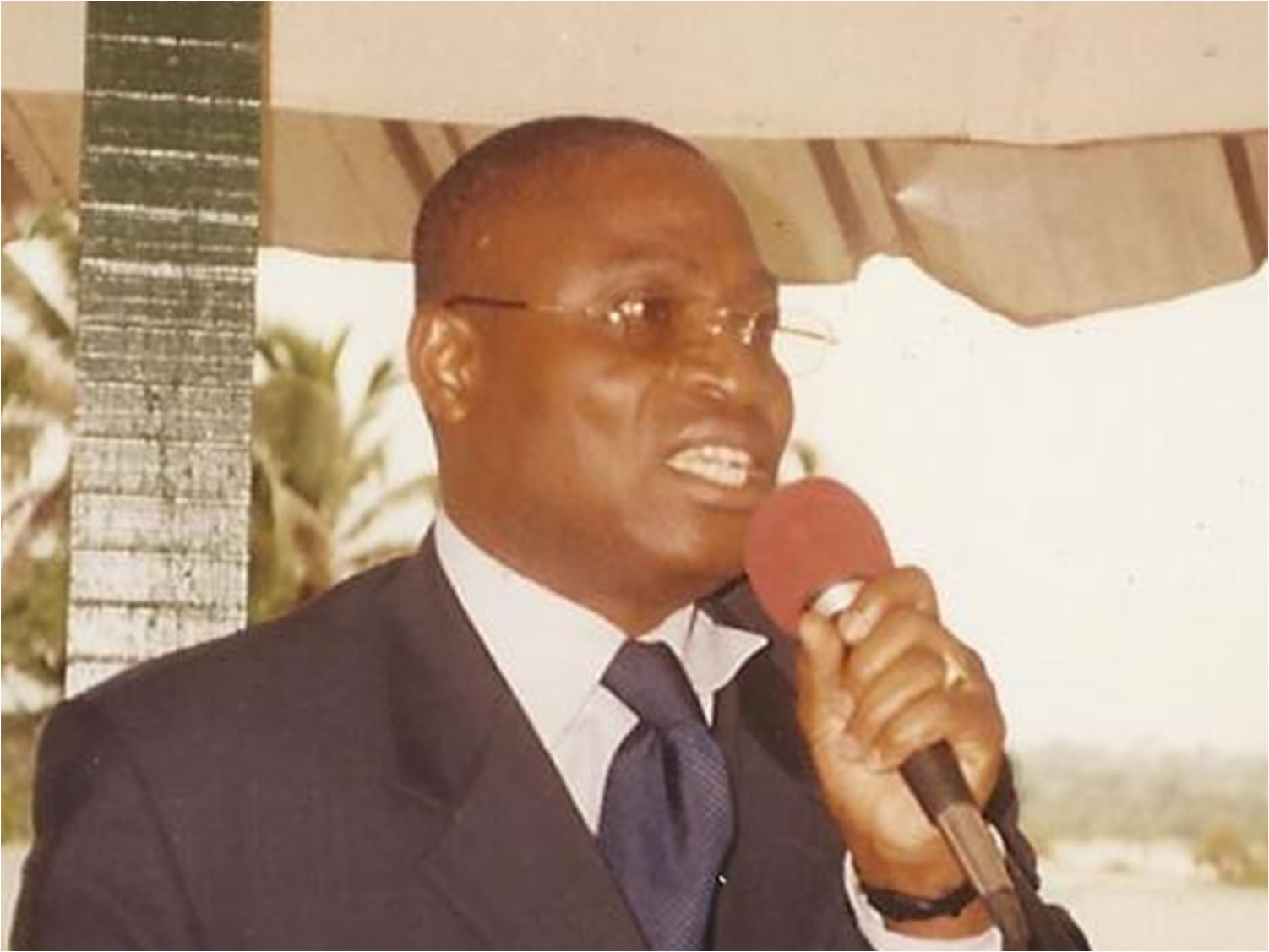
Dagobert Banzio in 2011.

Dagobert Banzio (21 June 1957 – 26 August 2017) was an Ivorian politician, government minister, and member of the Democratic Party of Côte d'Ivoire – African Democratic Rally (PDCI-RDA).

A member of the National Assembly, Banzio served as the Minister of Youth, Civil Education and Sports from December 2005 until 7 April 2007, within the government of Prime Minister Charles Konan Banny; Minister of Youth, Sports, and Recreation from April 2007 to 4 March 2010, with the first government of Prime Minister Guillaume Soro; Minister of Economic Infrastructure within Prime Minister Soro's second government from 4 March 2010 until 5 December 2010; Minister of Commerce with the administration of Prime Minister Jeannot Ahoussou-Kouadio from March 2012 to November 2012; and finally Minister of Youth, Sports and Urban Health for Prime Minister Soro's third government, which began in 2012.

Banzio was born in the western town of Tinhou, present-day Bloléquin Department, Ivory Coast, on 21 June 1957. He died in Paris, France, on 26 August 2017, at the age of 60 following a serious illness of several months.
