= Péhékanhouébli =

- Village
- Location in Ivory Coast
- Coordinates: 6°28′N 8°31′W
- Country: Ivory Coast
- District: Montagnes
- Region: Cavally
- Department: Toulépleu
- Sub-prefecture: Tiobly
- Time zone: UTC+0 (GMT)

Péhékanhouébli is a village in the far west of Ivory Coast. It is in the sub-prefecture of Tiobly, Toulépleu Department, Cavally Region, Montagnes District. The village serves as a border crossing with Liberia; the border is 400 metres southwest of the edge of the village.

Péhékanhouébli was a commune until March 2012, when it became one of 1,126 communes nationwide that were abolished.
