= Tiéolé-Oula =

- Village
- Location in Ivory Coast
- Coordinates: 5°44′N 7°24′W
- Country: Ivory Coast
- District: Montagnes
- Region: Cavally
- Department: Taï
- Sub-prefecture: Taï
- Time zone: UTC+0 (GMT)

Tiéolé-Oula is a village in the far west of Ivory Coast. It is in the sub-prefecture of Taï, Taï Department, Cavally Region, Montagnes District. The Cavally River—which is the border with Liberia—is four kilometres west of the village.

Tiéolé-Oula was a commune until March 2012, when it became one of 1,126 communes nationwide that were abolished.
