= Zéaglo =

- Town and sub-prefecture
- Location in Ivory Coast
- Coordinates: 6°34′N 7°47′W
- Country: Ivory Coast
- District: Montagnes
- Region: Cavally
- Department: Bloléquin

Population (2014)
  - Total: 18,664
- Time zone: UTC+0 (GMT)

Zéaglo is a town in western Ivory Coast. It is a sub-prefecture of Bloléquin Department in Cavally Region, Montagnes District.

Zéaglo was a commune until March 2012, when it became one of 1,126 communes nationwide that were abolished.

In 2014, the population of the sub-prefecture of Zéaglo was 18,664.

== Villages ==
The six villages of the sub-prefecture of Zéaglo and their population in 2014 are:

1. Béoué (2,743)
2. Douandrou (2,429)
3. Pohan (602)
4. Zéaglo (12,245)
5. Ziglo (645)
