= Zro =

Zro Ziaon; Zia
- Village
- Motto: Ziaon, tatchê!
- Location in Ivory Coast
- Coordinates: 6°18′N 7°31′W
- Country: Ivory Coast
- District: Montagnes
- Region: Cavally
- Department: Guiglo
- Sub-prefecture: Guiglo
- Time zone: UTC+0 (GMT)

Zro is a village in western Ivory Coast. It is in the sub-prefecture of Guiglo, Guiglo Department, Cavally Region, Montagnes District.

Zro was a commune until March 2012, when it became one of 1,126 communes nationwide that were abolished.
