= Bédy-Goazon =

- Town and sub-prefecture
- Location in Ivory Coast
- Coordinates: 6°34′N 7°47′W
- Country: Ivory Coast
- District: Montagnes
- Region: Cavally
- Department: Guiglo

Population (2014)
  - Total: 16,872
- Time zone: UTC+0 (GMT)

Bédy-Goazon is a town in western Ivory Coast. It is a sub-prefecture of Guiglo Department in Cavally Region, Montagnes District.

Bédy-Goazon was a commune until March 2012, when it became one of 1,126 communes nationwide that were abolished.

In 2014, the population of the sub-prefecture of Bédy-Goazon was 16,872.

== Villages ==
The three villages of the sub-prefecture of Bédy-Goazon and their population in 2014 are:

1. Bédy-Goazon (9,625)
2. Douédy-Guézon (5,252)
3. Zébly (1,995)
