= Nézobly =

Nézobly Bazobli
- Town and sub-prefecture
- Location in Ivory Coast
- Coordinates: 6°32′N 8°32′W
- Country: Ivory Coast
- District: Montagnes
- Region: Cavally
- Department: Toulépleu

Population (2014)
  - Total: 14,755
- Time zone: UTC+0 (GMT)

Nézobly (also spelled Bazobli) is a town in the far west of Ivory Coast, near the border with Liberia. It is a sub-prefecture of Toulépleu Department in Cavally Region, Montagnes District. The town is approximately three kilometres from the border, but there is no official border crossing in the vicinity.

Nézobly was a commune until March 2012, when it became one of 1,126 communes nationwide that were abolished.

In 2014, the population of the sub-prefecture of Nézobly was 6,679.

== Villages ==
The eight villages of the sub-prefecture of Nézobly and their population in 2014 are:

1. Kahibli (637)
2. Klaon (906)
3. Kpably (662)
4. Nézobly (1,911)
5. Tiabolébly 1 (523)
6. Touaplébli (704)
7. Toyébli (1,072)
8. Zaïgbopleu (264)
