= Adé Liz =

Ivorian singer, based in France

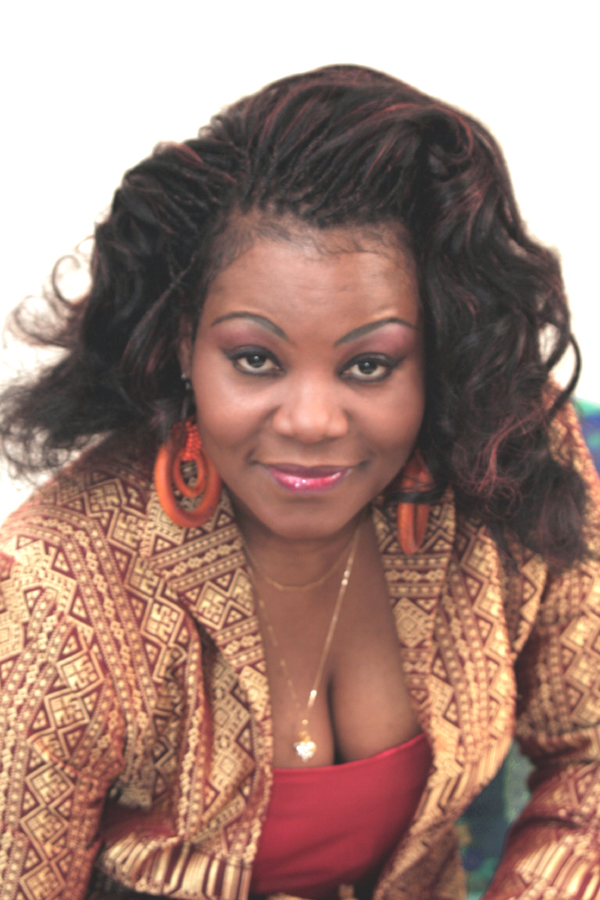

Background information
- Born: Zagné, Ivory Coast
- Origin: Paris, France
- Occupation: Singer
- Years active: 1985-Present

Adé Liz is an Ivorian singer, based in France. Born in western Ivory Coast to a traditional singer mother, she relocated to Paris in 1982, where she won the César for Best Ivorian song in 1987 with Kéhi. In 1990, the Jeunes Journalistes Blacks à Paris "JJBP" awarded her the Prix de la Révélation award. In 1991, her album release Deka made a name for herself in the Afro-Caribbean community in Panama.

In 2008 she released a compilation album of her best hits and a new song entitled Nahi. The following year she received the award for Best Ivorian artist in France.

== Early life and background ==
Liz was born in Zagné in the Guiglo Department in the western Ivory Coast. She grew up ion a strong music family, with her mother being a traditional singer. She developed her singing talents under choir master Pedro Wognin.

== Career ==
Liz left the Ivory Coast in 1982 and settled in Paris, where she met the singer Rose Bâ and became acquainted with numerous African musicians. Three years later she released her debut album, Mlen Gniniè, which was arranged by Sammy Massamba. In 1987, with Kéhi she won the César for Best Ivorian song.

Liz began touring in the United States, Germany, Belgium, Italy, and Burkina Faso. In 1990, the Jeunes Journalistes Blacks à Paris "JJBP" awarded her the Prix de la Révélation award. That year she performed at the 13th anniversary of Viva La Musica at the Bataclan theatre in Paris.

In 1991, Deka made a name for herself in the Afro-Caribbean community in Panama. That year the New African stated that she is "one of the new African entertainers who are breaking the myth surrounding musicians such as Aicha Kone and Rene Pelaige. She is a rising star and deserves mention".

She released the song Amour in 2006, which was arranged by Joss Inno. In 2008 she released a compilation album of her best hits and a new song entitled Nahi. In 2009, Liz won the award for Best Ivorian artist in France.

== Discography ==
- Mlen gniniè (1985)
- Kéhi (1987)
- Déka (1991)
- Doubla (1998)
- À toi (2006)
- Best of (2008)
- Ahé déhé (2005)
