= Toulépleu =

- Town, sub-prefecture, and commune
- Location in Ivory Coast
- Coordinates: 6°34′N 8°25′W
- Country: Ivory Coast
- District: Montagnes
- Region: Cavally
- Department: Toulépleu

Population (2014)
  - Total: 15,745
- Time zone: UTC+0 (GMT)

Toulépleu is a town in the far west of Ivory Coast, near the border with Liberia. It is a sub-prefecture and the seat of Toulépleu Department in Cavally Region, Montagnes District. Toulépleu is also a commune.
