= Diboké =

Diboké Dibohé
- Town and sub-prefecture
- Location in Ivory Coast
- Coordinates: 6°27′N 8°7′W
- Country: Ivory Coast
- District: Montagnes
- Region: Cavally
- Department: Bloléquin

Population (2014)
  - Total: 6,168
- Time zone: UTC+0 (GMT)

Diboké (also spelled Dibohé) is a town in western Ivory Coast. It is a sub-prefecture of Bloléquin Department in Cavally Region, Montagnes District.

Diboké was a commune until March 2012, when it became one of 1,126 communes nationwide that were abolished.

In 2014, the population of the sub-prefecture of Diboké was 6,168.

== Villages ==
The three villages of the sub-prefecture of Diboké and their population in 2014 are:

1. Diboké (4,605)
2. Oulai-Taibli (1,038)
3. Zilébli (525)
