= Nizahon =

- Town and sub-prefecture
- Location in Ivory Coast
- Coordinates: 6°19′N 7°25′W
- Country: Ivory Coast
- District: Montagnes
- Region: Cavally
- Department: Guiglo

Population (2014)
  - Total: 20,767
- Time zone: UTC+0 (GMT)

Nizahon is a town in western Ivory Coast. It is a sub-prefecture of Guiglo Department in Cavally Region, Montagnes District.

Nizahon was a commune until March 2012, when it became one of 1,126 communes nationwide that were abolished.

In 2014, the population of the sub-prefecture of Nizahon was 20,767.

== Villages ==
The four villages of the sub-prefecture of Nizahon and their population in 2014 are:

1. Béablo (5,140)
2. Béhébo (3,832)
3. Nizahon 1 (9,381)
4. Nizahon 2 (2,414)
