= Pack hunter =

Type of predatory animal

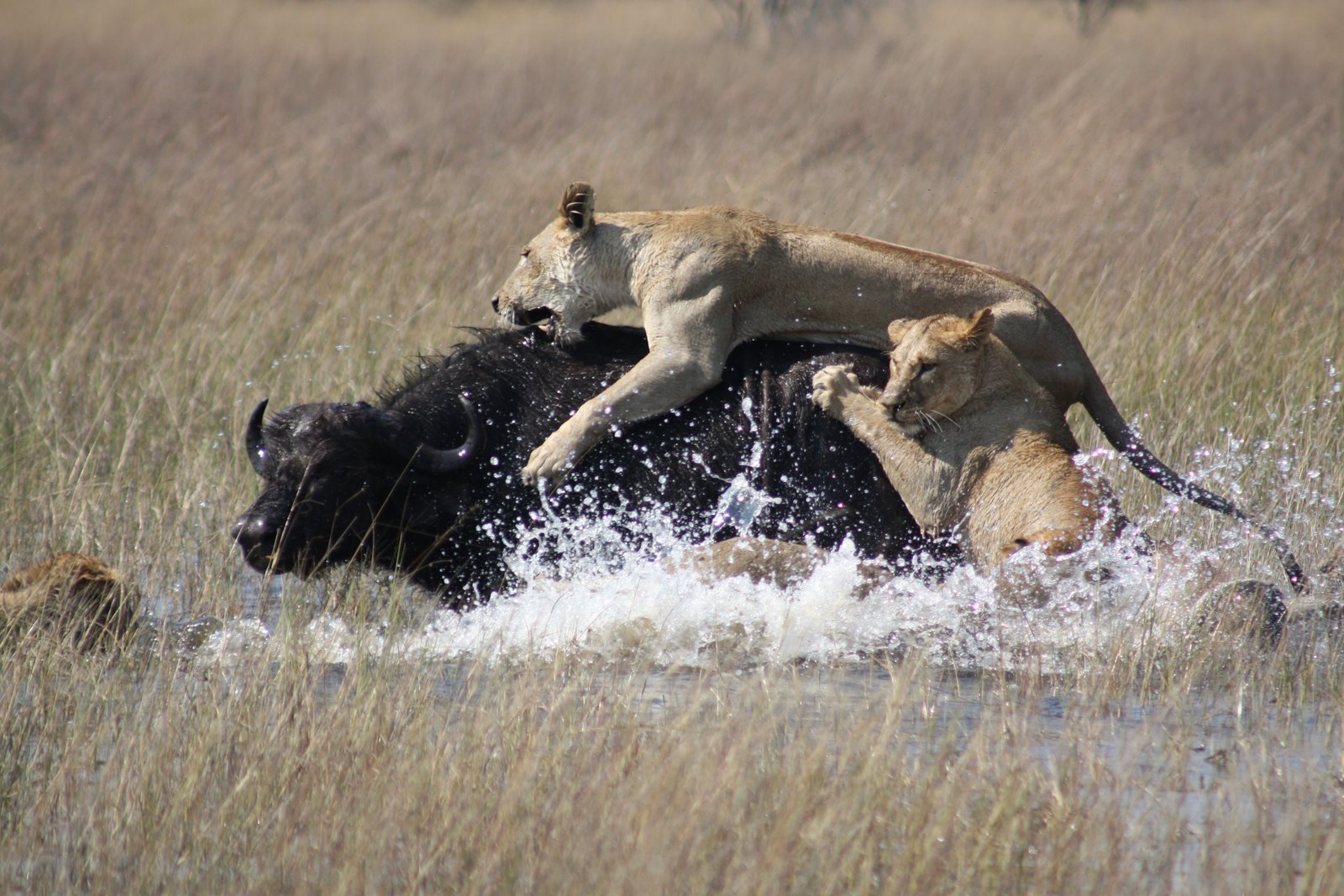
Lions working together to take down a large Cape buffalo.

A pack hunter or social predator is a predatory animal which hunts its prey by working together with other members of its species. When hunting cooperation is across two or more species, the broader term cooperative hunting is commonly used.

A well known pack hunter is the gray wolf; humans too can be considered pack hunters. Other pack hunting mammals include chimpanzees, dolphins including orcas, lions, dwarf and banded mongooses, as well as spotted hyenas. Avian social predators include the Harris's hawk, butcherbirds, three of four kookaburra species and many helmetshrikes. Other pack hunters include ants like army ants, the goldsaddle goatfish, and occasionally crocodilians.

Pack hunting is typically associated with cooperative breeding and its concentration in the Afrotropical realm is a reflection of this. Most pack hunters are found in the southern African savannas, with a notable absence in tropical rainforests and with the exception of the wolf and coyote, higher latitudes. It is thought that either on the ancient and poor soils of the southern African savanna it is not possible for individual predators to find adequate food, or that the environment's inherent unpredictability due to ENSO or IOD events means that in very bad conditions it will not be possible to raise the young necessary to prevent declining populations from adult mortality. It is also argued that Africa's large area of continuous flat and open country, which was even more extensive while rainforest contracted during glacial periods of the Quaternary, may have helped encourage pack hunting to become much more common than on any other continent.

Around 80–95% of carnivores are solitary and hunt alone. Groups that hunt cooperatively, at least some of the time, include mammals such as wolves and wild dogs, lions, spotted hyenas, chimpanzees and humans; archosaurs such as crocodilians and birds of prey; as well as large marine fishes such as groupers and moray eels. Cooperative hunting has been linked to the social organization of animal species and the evolution of sociality and thus provides a unique perspective to study group behavior. Some non-avian theropod dinosaurs, such as Albertosaurus sarcophagus, may have displayed pack behaviour.

== Evolution of cooperative hunting ==
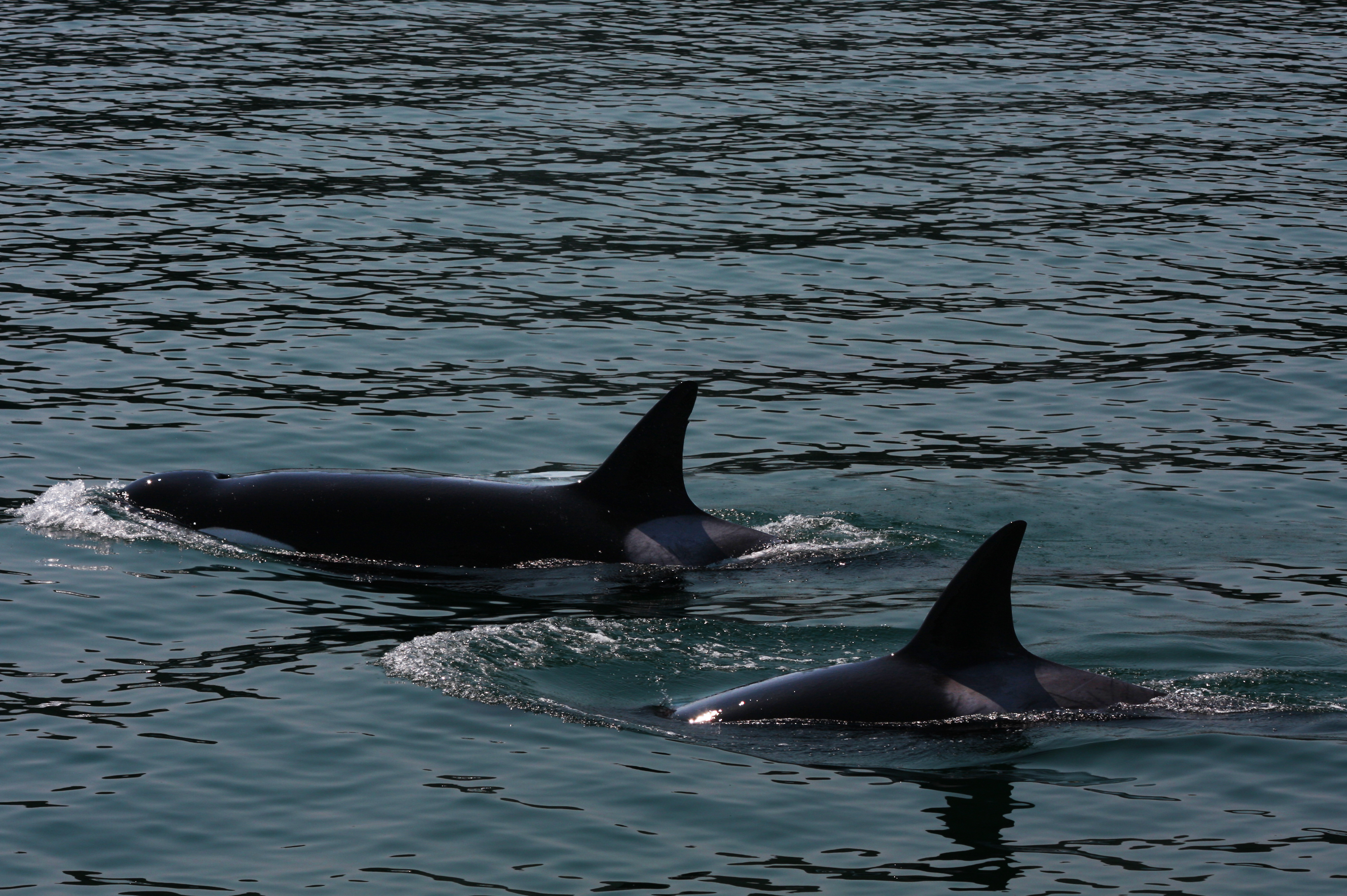
Transient orcas

Understanding how cooperative hunting could evolve requires considering the circumstances that would make it beneficial.

=== Evolutionary models ===
==== Conventional model: Packer and Ruttan Game Theory ====
In 1988, the ecologists Craig Packer and Lore Ruttan surveyed documented instances of cooperative hunting to make a game-theoretical model to explain under what circumstances cooperative hunting might evolve. In their model, individuals can engage in one of four hunting strategies:

- A cooperator engages prey both when it is alone or with a companion.
- A cheater only engages when it is the first to find prey, but lets another individual make the kill if it arrives second.
- A scavenger never hunts and waits for another individual to make a kill.
- A solitary avoids others and always hunts alone.

Each of these strategies has a certain efficiency based on the size and number of prey that can be captured in a hunt.

The model shows that cooperative hunting for a single large prey is an evolutionarily stable strategy (ESS)—a strategy that an individual adopts because failure to do so reduces its fitness—only when solitary hunting is much less efficient. This is usually due to a prey species being too large to be taken down by a single individual predator, meaning hunting efficiency is low and hunting cost is high. In this case, the increased benefit in hunting efficiency from cooperation must compensate for the division of available meat among cooperators. Furthermore, cooperatively hunting groups are prone to invasion by cheaters and scavengers who avoid the drawbacks of hunting, so the added benefit of cooperative hunting must also outweigh these costs. Otherwise, cheating and scavenging can also be evolutionarily stable strategies. The proportion of these strategies increases in larger groups, since only a certain number of individuals are required to help make the kill, allowing others to directly benefit without participating in the hunt.

When a species hunts a single prey small enough to be monopolized by an individual, cooperative hunting is rarely ever an ESS, since group members in essence all compete for a single meal. Unless individual prey-tracking and capture-efficiency is extremely low, solitary hunting is always the dominant strategy, since solitaries don't have to share their kill. Cheaters and scavengers never prosper in this situation, since the original captor monopolizes all the food. The model predicts that the only way cooperative hunting is an ESS for single small prey is if the predators are already constrained to live in groups—so they must share what they get in order to keep the group stable.

On the other hand, cooperative hunting is always an ESS when attacking multiple prey, both large and small. This is because cooperators no longer have to pay costs of dividing meat if they can each make their own kill. Another benefit is that when prey is sufficiently large it can be shared among cooperators if one member was unable to make a kill. Moreover, cheaters and scavengers only do well when hunting costs are very high, since they forgo the chance to get their own prey. In these parts of the model, cooperative hunting is always favorable, as long as there is some form of increase in net efficiency over solitary hunting. However, in their body of research, Packer and Ruttan found very few instances of this clear advantage over solitaries. They concluded that cooperative hunting in multiple-prey situations is more likely to be a result of pre-existing social bonds rather than an evolutionary adaptation, but that this hunting behavior is still important for establishing the social fabric of the group.

==== Revised model: Boesch's chimpanzees ====
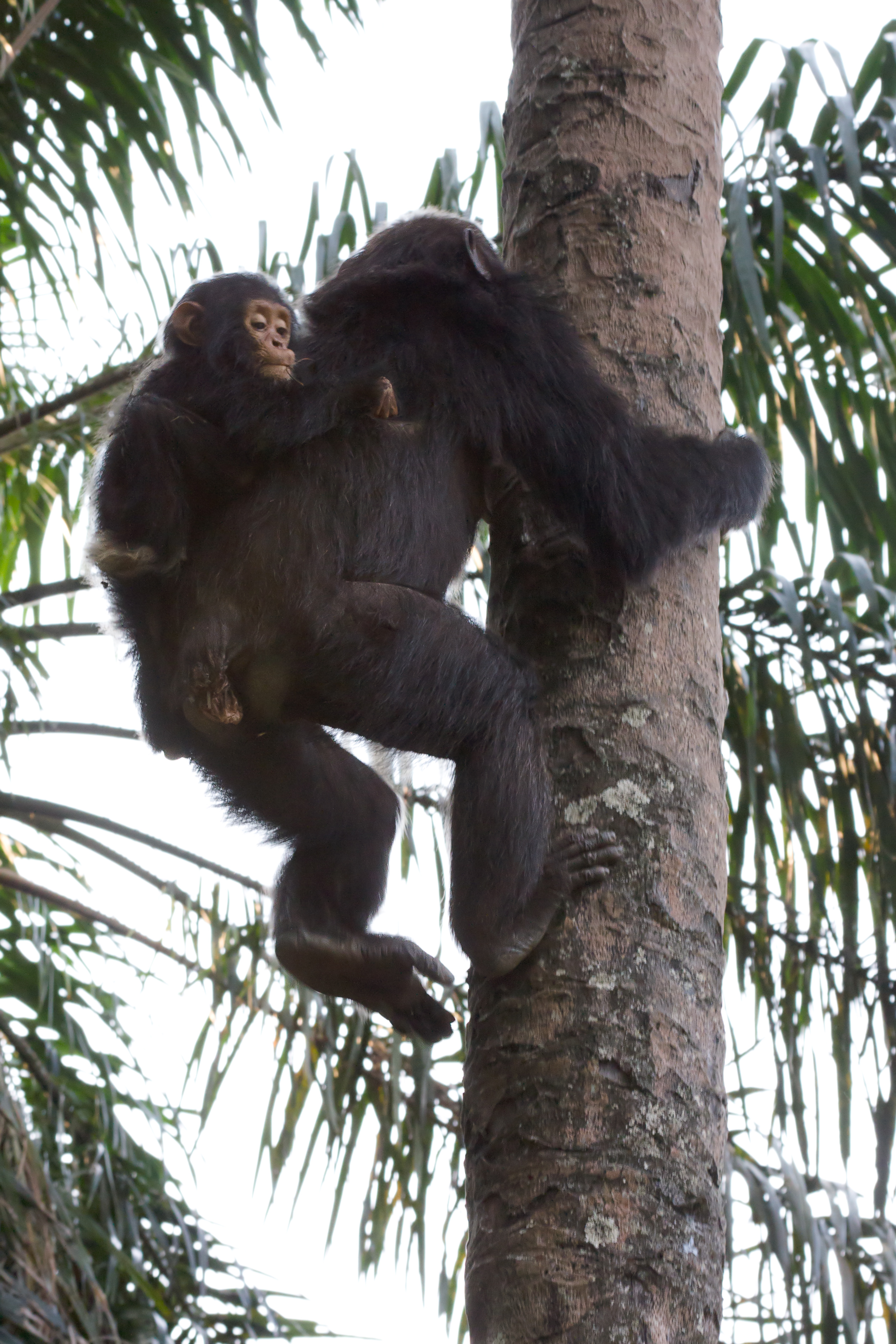
A female chimpanzee must carry her young through the trees, meaning it could be put in danger if she decides to pursue prey.

In 1994, Christophe Boesch condensed Packer and Ruttan's model to two basic conditions and added a crucial third component based on his study of chimpanzees (Pan troglodytes) in the Taï National Park of Côte d'Ivoire:

1. For hunting to evolve, in single individuals the rewards for hunting (meat intake) exceed the costs of hunting (energy used up, injury, illness).
2. For cooperative hunting to evolve, in single hunters the net gain (benefits less costs) of hunting together exceeds the net gain of hunting alone.
3. For cooperative hunting to remain stable, there must be some mechanism to prevent cheaters and scavengers from taking an unfair portion of the meat. Following his study of the Taï chimpanzees, Boesch showed that the meat is distributed in a manner proportional to an individual's contribution to the hunt. This social mechanism is thought to prevent cheaters from destabilizing the cooperative hunting paradigm by getting more that the net benefit of hunters. Additionally, this meat-sharing behavior is not related to the social hierarchy of the group, suggesting that it depends solely on participation in the hunt.

Curiously, among female Taï chimpanzees, cheating has become an ESS because there are substantially more costs associated with hunting, including the risk of dropping infants from trees and injuring them. Therefore, it pays females to be bystanders rather than hunt; in fact, the male strategy allows the female strategy to be stable provided the males provision their female partners with food.

On the other hand, in the chimpanzees of Gombe Stream National Park in Tanzania, cooperative hunting is not a stable strategy. The predator-prey interactions differ in Gombe chimpanzees in a way that has prevented cooperative hunting from evolving. Both Taï and Gombe chimps hunt small red colobus monkeys that live in trees; however, the trees are much smaller at Gombe, such that it is very easy for one chimp to capture its prey. At Taï, the trees are much taller (by about 30–40 meters), and it thus takes a larger effort to capture the prey. This disparity in height would favor the evolution of cooperative hunting at Taï (where multiple chimps can help one another out), but not at Gombe (where the benefits of cooperative hunting do not outweigh the costs of meat-sharing). In fact, single hunters gain much more meat than cooperative hunters in the Gombe population. It is therefore plausible that cooperative hunting evolved at Taï as a response to the more difficult distribution of monkeys in taller trees.

The results above suggest that social living in chimps may not be a necessary prerequisite for the evolution of cooperative hunting; instead, the distribution of resources is a critical determining factor.

=== Importance of resource distribution ===
The distribution of prey species is often the determining factor for whether populations hunt cooperatively. When prey is abundant throughout a habitat, cooperative hunting is not an effective strategy. Solitary hunters can easily find food on their own and do not share their kill. This case arises when prey is small enough to be captured by an individual. In contrast, when patches of prey are focused in small areas of a habitat, predators are likely to live in groups, to coordinate large attacks, and to kill more prey. This strategy illustrates the importance of group living in establishing cooperative hunting efforts. In this respect, cooperative hunting is not just a function of the species, but also of its environment. Consequentially, cooperative hunting most likely evolved in areas with scarce prey distribution, and patterns of this behavior are likely to vary with seasonal fluctuation of available resources.

Even species that normally exhibit solitary hunting behavior have been shown to engage in cooperative hunting when the distribution of prey makes it difficult for solitary hunters to be successful. For example, in aplomado falcons individuals generally hunt alone when searching for insects, as these hunts are simple and these insects are easy to find. However, the aplomado falcons generally hunt cooperatively when targeting smaller rodents and birds, as these hunts are lengthy and require high-speed chases. Thus the switch to hunting cooperatively often depends upon the resource distribution in certain species.

=== Implications on sociality ===
When resources are distributed in a way that supports group living, populations may develop social groups. Cooperative hunting is often a major feature of these groups, and it is one of the primary bases for the evolution of sociality in the order Carnivora. While alternate theories have concluded that cooperative hunting may not be as important a factor in sociality as territory-sharing and mutual protection of offspring, they still agree that it plays an important role in developing social groups. For example, as a result of cooperative hunting, aplomado falcons defend the nest together and share the food with offspring after the hunt. Cooperative hunting has thus proven to hold certain social groups together since it can be disadvantageous to hunt alone in particular situations. Future research may quantify the contribution of cooperative hunting to the evolution of sociality, as it is currently difficult to ascertain how much cooperative hunting is a cause or a consequence of social behavior.

== Adaptive significance ==
When an environment allows it, cooperative hunting can offer species a range of adaptive advantages not normally available through solitary hunting.

=== Adaptive advantages ===
There are two main goals to cooperative hunting in social carnivores: taking down large prey species through a coordinated effort and subsequently protecting their kill from scavengers. A common goal in cooperatively hunting pairs is to coordinate the separation of a mother and her offspring, facilitating an easier kill that a solitary hunter could not make. Cooperative hunting is also important in species that prey on larger animals, such as African hunting dogs, as it allows them to make a kill in a safer, more efficient manner. After the kill has been made, the hunters restrict meat access to those involved in the hunt to protect their food from scavengers. This includes both strictly scavenging species and members of their own species who do not participate in the hunt. In these ways, cooperative hunting confers adaptive advantages by affording species a means to make more efficient kills and by ensuring they get the maximum amount of food possible from their kill.

Another advantage of cooperative hunting is that attacking in a group allows more opportunities to make a kill before the prey scatters and gets away. There is also the potential to confuse the prey species so they may run into another hunter approaching from a different direction. Group attacks are particularly advantageous when prey live in concentrated groups, as hunters have a hard time tracking prey in territories outside the preferred habitat.

Higher success in prey capture has been demonstrated in wild dogs, bottlenose dolphins, and other cetaceans, falcons, and fossa due to cooperative hunting. For example, aplomado falcons increase their efficiency of capture when hunting in pairs because the pairs are twice as successful as hunting alone. As a result, the high overall success rate of cooperative hunting leads to higher per capita meat intake even in large groups.

=== Economics of group size ===
Many populations capable of forming cooperative hunting groups may not necessarily do so if their group is too small or too large for this behavior to be favorable. Group size is an important indicator of specific instances of cooperative hunting, as the prey must be large enough and the hunting group small enough to provide enough food for all individuals. Another important consideration is that when groups grow larger, there is a greater chance that individuals will engage in a cheater strategy. If there is consistently too much cheating in a group, individuals will prefer to hunt alone so they do not have to share their meal with freeloaders.

There may be costs that set an upper limit on group size. The net benefits increase as a function of pack size, as more animals in a group are theoretically able to obtain more meat. However, in African wild dogs, researchers found that the most common group size was not the group size that maximized net benefits. Instead, because larger packs must travel farther to get more food, there are travelling costs associated with larger groups. Thus, African wild dogs optimize a more appropriate currency: the amount of meat gained per dog per kilometer traveled, instead of the amount of meat gained per dog per day as the latter does not take into account the costs of hunting. This research successfully demonstrates that varying ecological variables are responsible for the difference in optimum group size among cooperatively hunting animals.

== Division of labor ==
Division of labor, with each team member performing a subtask to complete an objective, is found in many species. It has been shown that animals that forage and hunt cooperatively in groups often adopt specialized roles during a hunting event, which can vary widely among different species. Division of labor among cooperatively hunting species occurs along a continuum, ranging from species in which individuals never differentiate into specific roles to species in which individuals specialize into different roles that they always perform throughout their lifetime.

=== African wild dogs ===
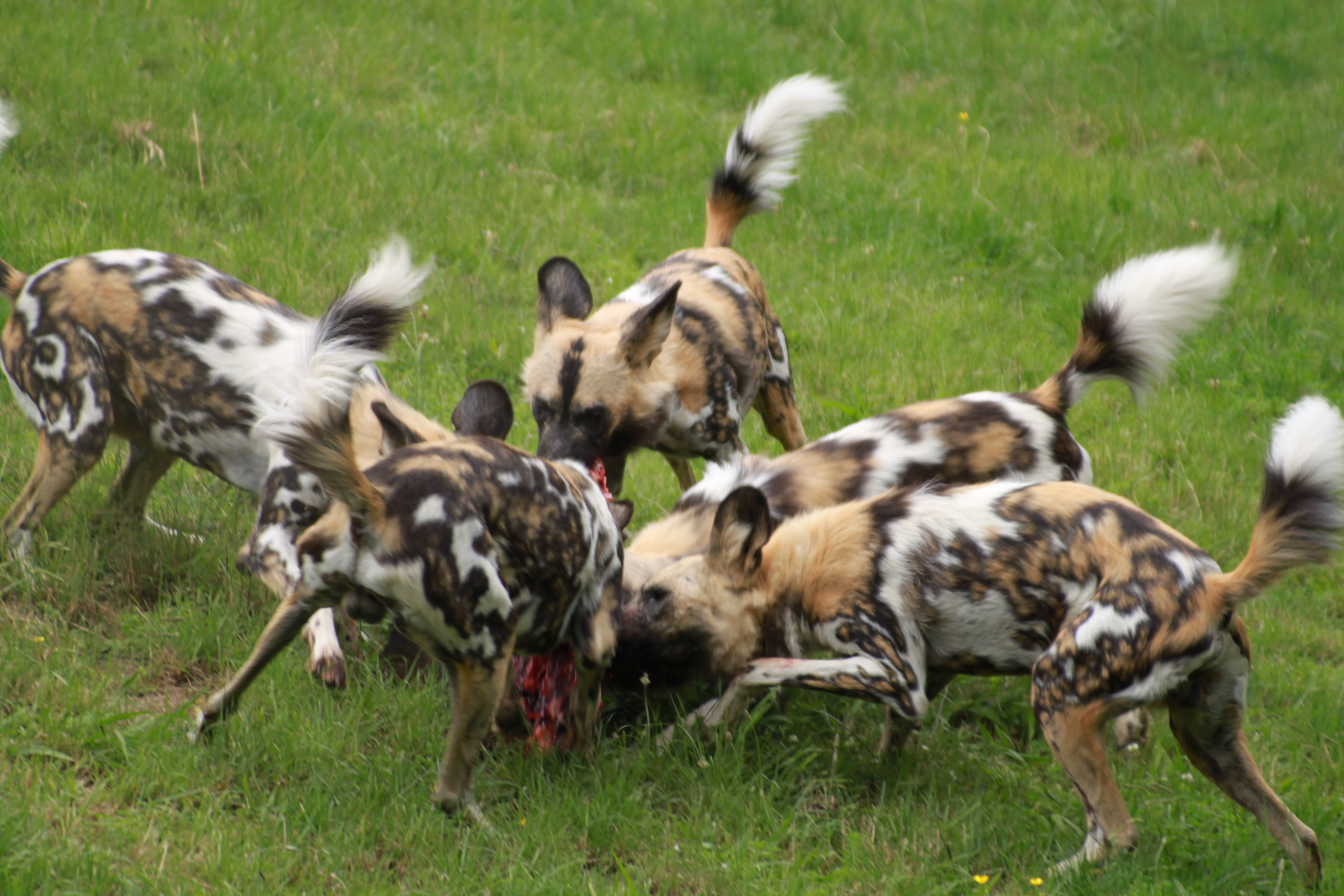
African wild dogs eating the spoils of their hunt

African wild dogs participate in an intense rally ceremony before hunting. Its function is to ensure that all the members are alert and ready to hunt. They then all trot together and participate in a chase during which they pursue and harass the prey. Instead of immediately attacking the prey, which could result in small prey immediately fleeing and large prey forming a defensive pinwheel and charging, the dogs form a defensive formation. Despite their coordinated formation, there is no clear role specialization in this species, as all individuals perform essentially the same function.

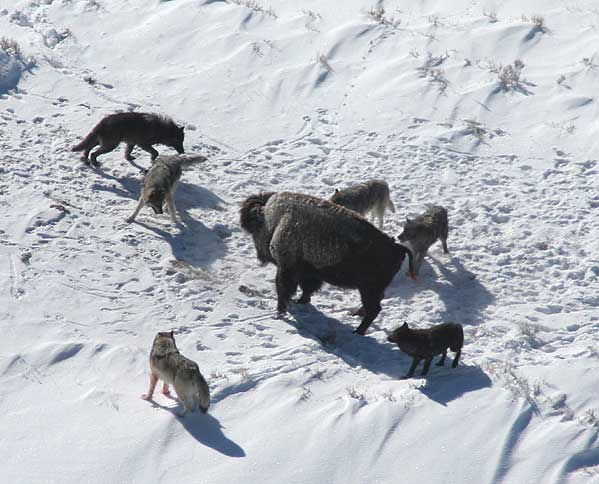
Canadian Gray Wolves surrounding a bison

=== Alaskan wolves ===
Co-operation between wolves in a pack is most visible in their hunting strategy, and is highly effective. A wolf pack may trail a herd of elk, caribou or other large prey for days, looking for an animal that displays any sign of weakness, before making its move. In open areas, wolves may precede the hunt with group ceremonies involving standing nose-to-nose and wagging their tails. Once concluded, the pack heads towards the prey, chasing it down and then surrounding it. Once the attack begins the wolves have specific roles in the hunt, based on age, gender and social standing, as well as its particular experience and abilities. The youngest wolves frequently do nothing more than observe and learn from the sidelines. Speedy, lightly built females often take on herding roles, darting back and forth in front of prey, causing confusion and preventing escape. Slower but more powerful males are able to take down a large animal more aggressively and quickly.

=== Aplomado falcons ===
Aplomado falcons monitor each other's movements during hunts. Males and females always perform the same task in every situation. They begin perched together and the males initiate and give a sharp "chirp" vocalization to signal for the female to follow suit. When chasing birds on the ground, the females follow right behind the birds in the bushes and the males swoop in from overhead to make the kill. Within these pairs, males and females are consistently assigned to a particular role.

=== Bottlenose dolphins ===
Individual role specialization has also been observed in bottlenose dolphins. The bottlenose dolphins form groups of three to six. One dolphin acts as the "driver" and herds the fish in circles towards the "barrier dolphins" who are tightly grouped together to form a barrier. The driver performs fluke-slaps to cause the fish to leap into the air. As the fish begin to leap, the driver moves next to the barrier dolphins, who all catch the fish in the air with their mouths open. Stefanie Gazda and colleagues predict that this role specialization is more common in marine than terrestrial animals due to a higher variability in prey diversity, biomass, and predator mobility in the ocean. One specific type of cooperative feeding behavior is mud ring feeding.

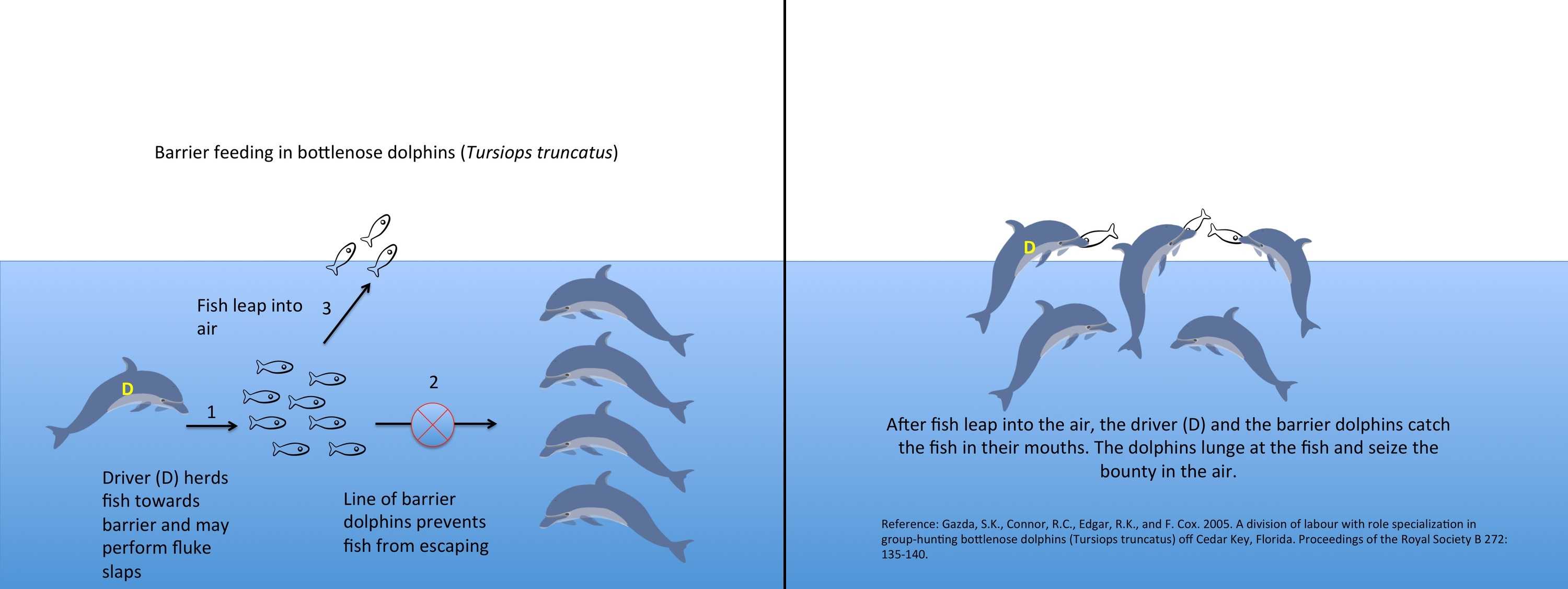
A team of dolphins each fill a specialized role to make fish jump in the air. In this vulnerable position, they are easy prey for the dolphin team.

=== Lions ===
Cooperative hunting strategy in lions is based on groups of three to seven individuals split into two highly specialized roles, centers and wings, which coordinate their movement to encircle and ambush the prey. In a line of lions, the outside individuals, also known as the wings, first run out to the sides of the intended target while the center lies in an ambush position. As the wings slowly encircle their mark, they drive the prey towards the waiting center—often one of the older and heavier individuals in the group—who then pounces to make the kill. Each individual in the group learns its preferred role during youth, whether it be center or wing. A child does not necessarily perform the same position as its mother since it learns through observing other lionesses in the pride. Individuals have also been shown to perform positions other than their natural place depending on whether another individual has already filled their role. Despite this plasticity, hunting success is greatest when every individual in the group can perform its specialized role.

=== Chimpanzees ===
In Taï, chimpanzee, individuals participate as a driver, blocker, chaser, or ambusher. Drivers follow the prey without trying to catch up with it. Blockers place themselves in a tree to block the progression of the prey. Chasers move quickly after the prey to catch up with it. Finally, ambushers anticipate the escape route of the prey long enough in advance to force it back towards the chasers or down into the lower canopy. Blocking and ambushing are thought to require much more cognitive effort in anticipating the future movements of the prey, and they are thus rewarded with a larger proportion of meat after a successful hunt. These two roles correlate positively with the age of the chimpanzee as the cognitive function necessary to perform these tasks is thought to increase with age. Furthermore, individuals can change roles during the same hunt or maintain their same role during the entire process.

=== Fossa ===
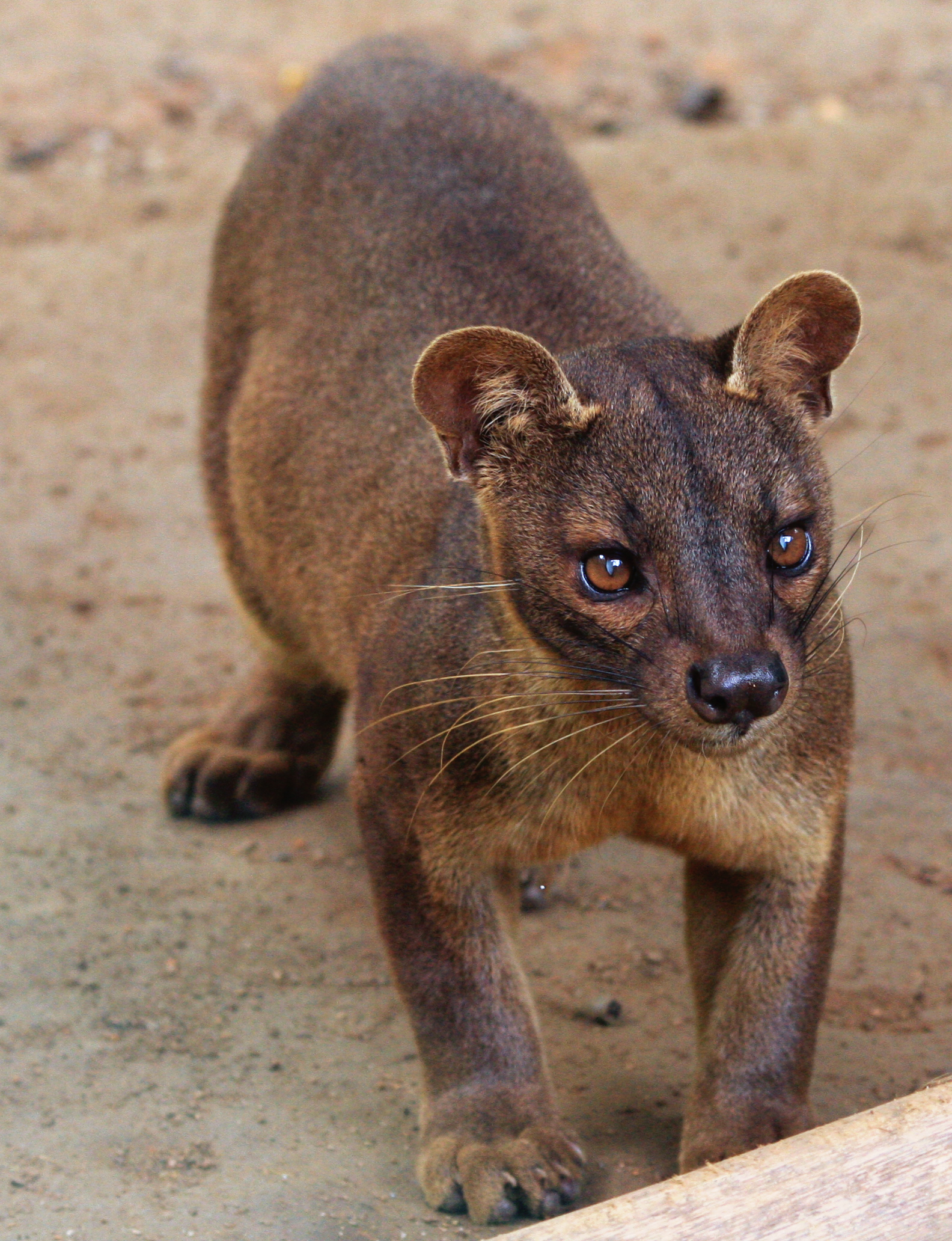
The usually solitary fossa sometimes hunts cooperatively.

Fossa (Cryptoprocta ferox) are the first documented example of cooperative hunting in solitary species, as fossa are some of the least social carnivores. The fossa is the largest member of Madagascar euplerids. They are carnivorous, feeding mostly on small lemurs and tenrecs. Prey size may have been important for the evolution of cooperative hunting in fossa because one of their main sources of prey (larger lemurs) has recently gone extinct. Larger lemurs (20–120 pounds), such as giant sloth lemurs, were abundant on Madagascar until 500–1500 years ago. Cooperative hunting was common to take down a prey of this size. However, since extinction was relatively recent, cooperative hunting may have persisted even after their prey size diminished.

=== Spiders ===
Stegodyphid spiders (Genus Stegodyphus) have been shown to act cooperatively to trap and collect insect prey species. These social arachnids cooperate both by spinning communal webs on which to catch prey and by moving together to catch large prey in the field, such as grasshoppers. These spiders do not monopolize certain parts of the web, meaning any individual can use a variety of locations to lie in wait for prey. When prey is captured in the field, it usually requires at least two spiders to be brought back to the nest to be shared among the rest of the colony.

=== Humans ===
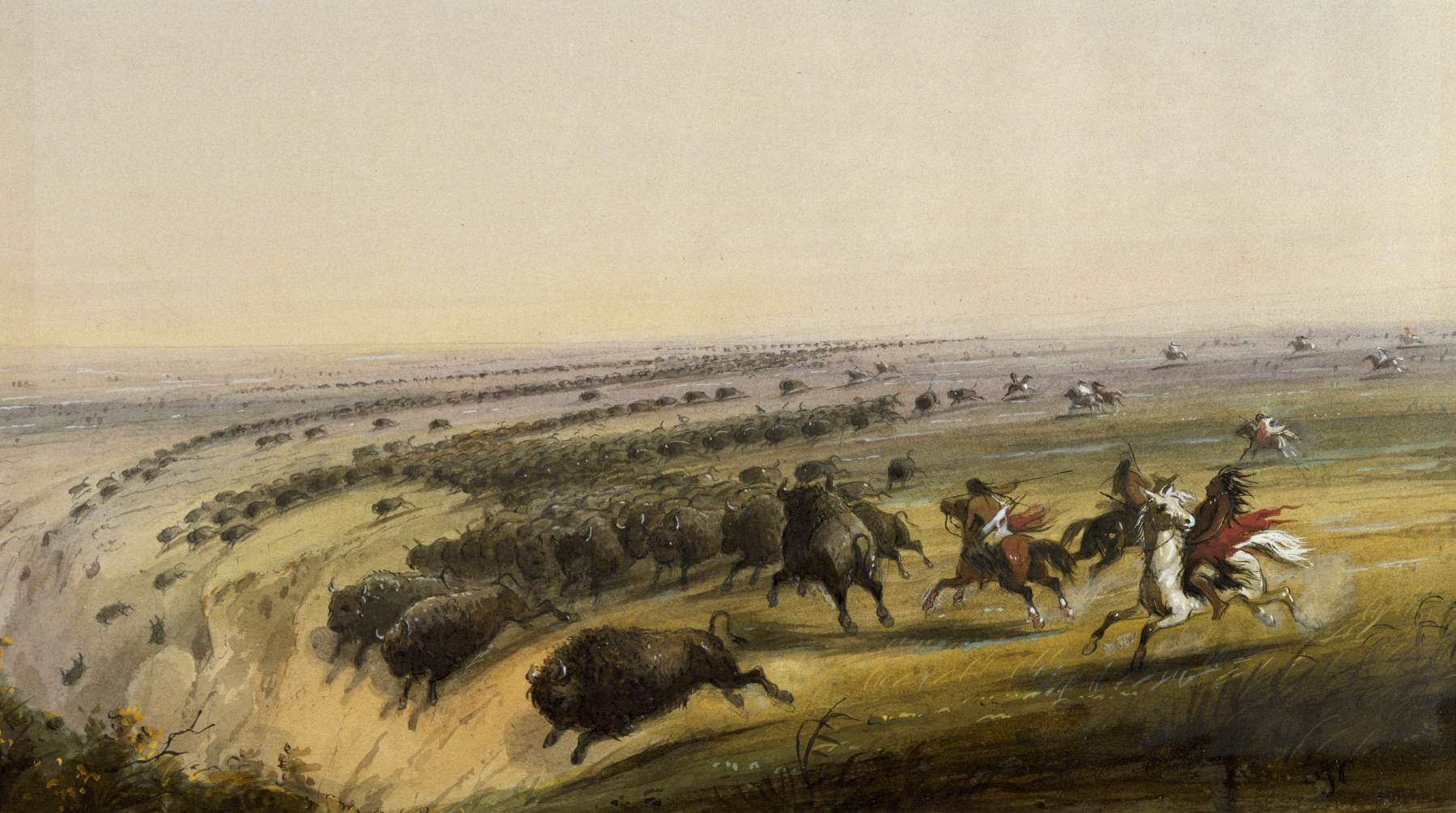
Hunting Buffalo by Alfred Jacob Miller, c. 1859

Research at Lamalera village in Indonesia has shown how cooperative hunting can develop in pre-industrial societies. This village relies on traditional whale hunting techniques for its livelihood. Because whale hunting requires more than one individual, it benefits the villagers to hunt cooperatively. The hunting men cooperate either as crew members, corporate members, or craftsmen. Each performs a different duty and receives a different share of whale meat. Alvard echoes other research by suggesting that these shared norms of meat distribution sustains cooperative hunting and prevents the rise of cheaters.

This research also details the importance of biological relatedness amongst a cooperative hunting group. Kin selection favours traits or behaviours that promote the survival of relatives. At Lamalera, only kin that are of the same lineage (that all descend from male relatives or all descend from female relatives) hunt together. The researchers suggest that this allows an unambiguous identification of the relatedness of other group members.

=== Crocodilians ===
Research conducted by Vladmir Dinets has indicated that crocodilians regularly engage in cooperative hunting behavior, including highly organized game drives. Behaviours noted by Dinets include forming tight "bait balls" when hunting fish and being able to anticipate the location and actions of other crocodiles without being able to see them for an ambush. Dinets suggests this may make crocodiles some of a small group of animals that can cooperate in such sophisticated ways.

== Interspecific ==
Interspecific cooperative hunters

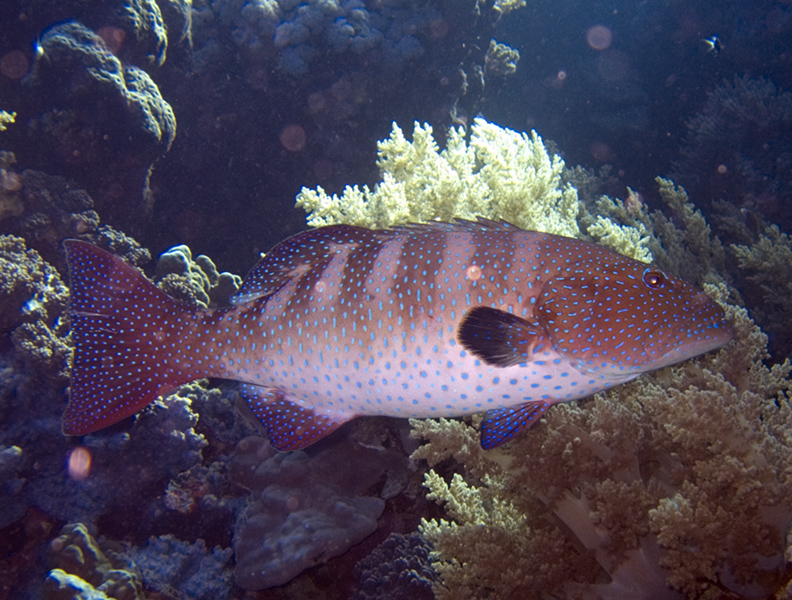
Grouper

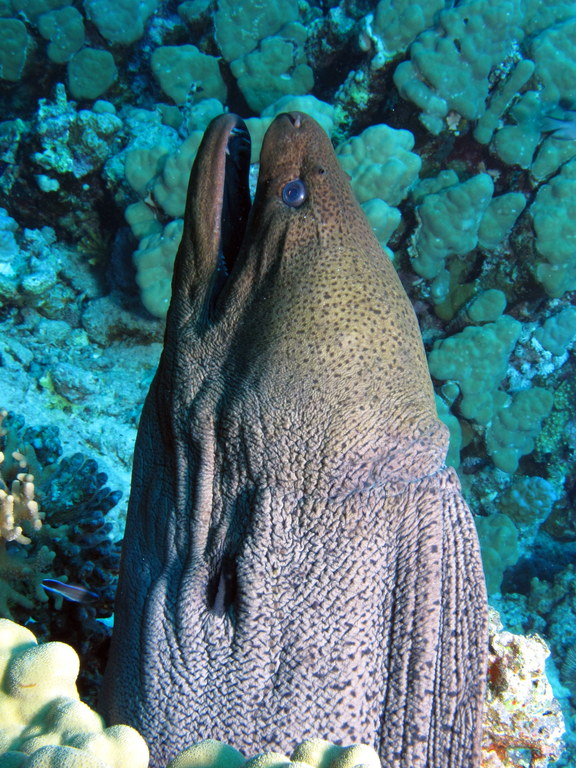
Giant moray

Groupers (Plectropomus pessuliferus marisrubri) and giant moray eels (Gymnothorax javanicus) provide compelling evidence for interspecific cooperative hunting. Groupers visit moray eels at their resting places and provide visual signals (such as a head shake) to engage morays in the hunt. These associations are non-random and appear to be motivated by the hunger level of the groupers. Groupers were able to capture prey five times more quickly with morays present because the eels could sneak through crevices and corner prey items; additionally, morays that hunted alone were never successful because they did not have a grouper present to lead them to the prey. Thus, the hunting success of groupers and giant moray eels is greater for both species than when hunting alone.

== Implications for cognition ==
Cooperative hunting is sometimes thought to reflect advanced cognitive processes, such as foresight, planning, and theory of mind and involve complex communication between hunters. However, several lines of evidence indicate that many instances of cooperative hunting rely on simple principles and can be observed in species without large brains or advanced cognitive abilities. Nevertheless, cooperative hunting occurs at different levels of complexity, and the most advanced levels may reflect a higher level of cognitive ability. In addition, frequent and successful pack hunting may depend on a higher level of social harmony, complexity, or intelligence, which may facilitate concerted group activities. In general, not much data has been collected on this topic, and new technologies and equipment may allow the collection of enough observations to answer these questions.

=== Levels of complexity ===
Many species, including spiders, have been observed to take down prey in groups. However, the mere act of multiple animals killing and sharing prey does not by itself indicate any level of advanced coordination. To differentiate between different levels of cooperative hunting, Boesch & Boesch developed a scheme for categorizing group hunts:

- Similarity occurs when hunters focus similar actions on the same prey, but without temporal or spatial coordination, as is the case with the aforementioned spiders.
- Synchrony occurs when hunters display temporal coordination, for example initiating the hunt at the same time, but display no spatial coordination.
- Coordination occurs when hunters coordinate both temporally and spatially, adjusting their positions based on the behaviour of their partners.
- Collaboration occurs when hunters do not merely perform the same or similar actions in a coordinated manner, but adopt different and complementary roles such as driving and ambushing.

A variety of social carnivores, such as wolves, lions, and African wild dogs have been observed to operate at the level of coordination and occasionally collaboration, while some populations of chimps have been observed to collaborate frequently with several distinct roles.

=== Arguments against cognitive complexity ===
While it is easy to attribute complex cognitive processes to animals hunting in a coordinated manner, this apparently complex behaviour may be explained in terms of more simple mental operations. For example, the hunting tactics of wolves, which involve fanning out and encircling prey, are argued to have been replicated in a computer simulation where the wolves were programmed with two simple rules: (1) Get within a minimum safe distance from the prey (2) Once this distance is achieved, move away from hunting partners. Ambushing is also argued to have been represented in this simulation by wolves who begin randomly at different locations. This simulation matches the coordination level of complexity, leaving open the question of the cognitive processes necessary for collaboration.

Another argument consists of observations that several animals not usually thought of as cognitively complex have been observed to hunt cooperatively, and in some cases collaboratively. For example, grouper fish have been observed to recruit giant moray eels into collaborative hunts, where their complementary hunting strategies increase the feeding success of both. The gestures performed by the grouper fish fulfill the criteria for a referential gesture, a signalling behaviour previously only observed in humans, great apes, and ravens. In addition, cooperative and collaborative hunting has been observed in other unlikely candidates, such as crocodiles and Cuban boas.

Using AI modeling, a Nagoya University research team led by Kazushi Tsutsui found that cooperative hunting behavior could be reliably predicted using a reinforcement learning stimulation, a type of learning common to animals with lower levels of cognitive complexity. They concluded that "elaborate coordination can be achieved through a relatively simple decision process of mapping between observations and actions via distance-dependent internal representations formed by prior experience."

=== Arguments for cognitive complexity ===
In contrast to social carnivores, who normally hunt cooperatively and only occasionally take on complementary roles, chimpanzees in Taï National Park regularly hunt collaboratively. They have been observed to use four different specialized roles, including ambushing, blocking, chasing, and driving. Christophe Boesch has argued that this level of collaborative complexity is indicative of several advanced cognitive processes. For example, chimps must successfully attribute physical abilities to their prey and use this information to predict which tree they may reach and when. In addition, chimps require knowledge of their partner's roles and the information they possess about the prey's location in order to infer the direction of the prey and adjust their behaviour accordingly.

Even more advanced than these predictive abilities may be the ability to participate in collaborative activities with shared goals and intentions, which Michael Tomasello calls shared intentionality. Tomasello claims that this ability involves unique mental representations and a level of cognitive and social complexity only achieved by humans. However, Boesch counters this by pointing out that Taï chimps fulfill all the hallmarks of shared intentionality, bringing into question either the uniqueness or the complexity of this cognitive process.

=== Social intelligence and cooperative hunting ===
While the majority of group hunting behaviours do not seem to take much cognitive complexity, it has been observed that species that receive a large portion of their food from cooperative hunts tend to have a complex or harmonious social structure. This includes many of the prototypical social carnivores, such as wolves and wild dogs. A harmonious pack structure may allow for the emergence of more frequent cooperative hunts, as group activities and food sharing are facilitated by lower levels of aggression and fear. For example, spotted hyenas have been found to be better at a cooperative problem-solving task with a food reward than chimpanzees. In addition, their performance is modulated by social factors, such as the presence of an audience and the social rank of their partner. Bonobos were likewise found to be better at a cooperative task with a food reward than other, more aggressive chimpanzees.

== See also ==
- Cooperation
- Evolutionary models of food sharing
- Foraging
