= Kaadé =

- Town and sub-prefecture
- Location in Ivory Coast
- Coordinates: 6°34′N 7°43′W
- Country: Ivory Coast
- District: Montagnes
- Region: Cavally
- Department: Guiglo

Population (2014)
  - Total: 25,253
- Time zone: UTC+0 (GMT)

Kaadé is a town in western Ivory Coast. It is a sub-prefecture of Guiglo Department in Cavally Region, Montagnes District.

Kaadé was a commune until March 2012, when it became one of 1,126 communes nationwide that were abolished.

In 2014, the population of the sub-prefecture of Kaadé was 25,253.

== Villages ==
The six villages of the sub-prefecture of Kaadé and their population in 2014 are:

1. Béoua (4,507)
2. Guinkin (5,964)
3. Guézon (1,144)
4. Kaadé (6,853)
5. Niouldé (3,430)
6. Troya 2 (3,355)
