= Bakoubli =

- Town and sub-prefecture
- Location in Ivory Coast
- Coordinates: 6°28′N 8°25′W
- Country: Ivory Coast
- District: Montagnes
- Region: Cavally
- Department: Toulépleu

Population (2014)
  - Total: 4,013
- Time zone: UTC+0 (GMT)

Bakoubli is a town in the far west of Ivory Coast, near the border with Liberia. It is a sub-prefecture of Toulépleu Department in Cavally Region, Montagnes District.

Bakoubli was a commune until March 2012, when it became one of 1,126 communes nationwide that were abolished.

In 2014, the population of the sub-prefecture of Taï was 31,928.

== Villages ==
The 12 villages of the sub-prefecture of Taï and their population in 2014 are:

1. Daobly (3,783)
2. Gouléako 1 (335)
3. Gouléako 2 (824)
4. Paulé-Oula (1,777)
5. Ponan (4,543)
6. Taϊ (5,917)
7. Diéro-Oula (2,256)
8. Port-Gentil (1,004)
9. Sakré (3,659)
10. Sioblo-Oula (2,718)
11. Tiolé-Oula (2,525)
12. Ziriglo (2,587)
