= Tiobly =

- Town and sub-prefecture
- Location in Ivory Coast
- Coordinates: 6°32′N 8°30′W
- Country: Ivory Coast
- District: Montagnes
- Region: Cavally
- Department: Toulépleu

Population (2014)
  - Total: 4,965
- Time zone: UTC+0 (GMT)

Tiobly is a town in the far west of Ivory Coast, near the border with Liberia. It is a sub-prefecture of Toulépleu Department in Cavally Region, Montagnes District. Tiobly is approximately seven kilometres east and seven kilometres north of the border with Liberia. The sub-prefecture extends further west than any other sub-prefecture in the country.

Tiobly was a commune until March 2012, when it became one of 1,126 communes nationwide that were abolished.

== Villages ==
1. Bawombli (299)
2. Bazobli (308)
3. Douoguibly (346)
4. Guéya (324)
5. Guéyédé (1,013)
6. Klobli (566)
7. Ouloto-Zrébli (215)
8. Péhékanhouébli (775)
9. Tiobly (971)
