= ZRO =

ZRO may refer to:

- Zro, a village in the Ivory Coast
- Z-Ro, American rapper
- Zomi Revolutionary Organisation, the parent organization of the insurgent group Zomi Revolutionary Army
- zro, ISO 639-3 code for the Záparo language
- Zirconium monoxide, ZrO
