= Bloléquin =

- Town, sub-prefecture, and commune
- Location in Ivory Coast
- Coordinates: 6°34′N 8°0′W
- Country: Ivory Coast
- District: Montagnes
- Region: Cavally
- Department: Bloléquin

Area
  - Total: 1,670 km^{2} (640 sq mi)

Population (2021 census)
  - Total: 123,133
  - Density: 73.7/km^{2} (191/sq mi)
  - Town: 32,262
- (2014 census)
- Time zone: UTC+0 (GMT)

Bloléquin is a town in western Ivory Coast. It is a sub-prefecture of and the seat of Bloléquin Department in Cavally Region, Montagnes District. Bloléquin is also a commune.

In 2021, the population of the sub-prefecture of Bloléquin was 123,133.

== Villages ==
The villages of the sub-prefecture of Bloléquin and their population in 2014 are:

1. Blédi-Diéya (2 148)
2. Bloléquin (13 635)
3. Goya (12 447)
4. Guéya (1 528)
5. Médibli (573)
6. Yoya (1 041)
