= Zagné =

- Town and sub-prefecture
- Location in Ivory Coast
- Coordinates: 6°13′N 7°29′W
- Country: Ivory Coast
- District: Montagnes
- Region: Cavally
- Department: Taï

Area
  - Total: 2,120 km^{2} (820 sq mi)

Population (2021 census)
  - Total: 74,478
  - Density: 35.1/km^{2} (91.0/sq mi)
  - Town: 48,863
- (2014 census)
- Time zone: UTC+0 (GMT)

Zagné is a town in western Ivory Coast. It is a sub-prefecture of Taï Department in Cavally Region, Montagnes District.

Prior to 2013, when Taï Department was created, Zagné was a sub-prefecture of Guiglo Department. A small portion of the sub-prefecture of Zagné lies within Taï National Park.

Zagné was a commune until March 2012, when it became one of 1,126 communes nationwide that were abolished.

In 2014, the population of the sub-prefecture of Zagné was 71,020.

== Notable people ==
- Adé Liz, singer

== Villages ==
The eight villages of this sub-prefecture and their population are:

1. Djidoubaye (5,092)
2. Gahably (1,614)
3. Goulégui-Béoué (2,939)
4. Kéibly (5,905)
5. Tienkoula (2,229)
6. Vodélobly (2,314)
7. Zagné (48,863)
8. Zaϊpobly (2,064)
