= Tinhou =

- Town and sub-prefecture
- Location in Ivory Coast
- Coordinates: 6°26′N 8°9′W
- Country: Ivory Coast
- District: Montagnes
- Region: Cavally
- Department: Bloléquin

Population (2014)
  - Total: 13,293
- Time zone: UTC+0 (GMT)

Tinhou is a town in western Ivory Coast. It is a sub-prefecture of Bloléquin Department in Cavally Region, Montagnes District.

Tinhou was a commune until March 2012, when it became one of 1,126 communes nationwide that were abolished.

In 2014, the population of the sub-prefecture of Tinhou was 13,293.

== Villages ==
The six villages of the sub-prefecture of Tinhou and their population in 2014 are:

1. Dédjan (1,888)
2. Koadéguézon (1,708)
3. Petit-Guiglo (1,803)
4. Tinhou (5,370)
5. Tuambly (1,502)
6. Zou-Yahi (1,022)
