= Péhé =

- Town and sub-prefecture
- Location in Ivory Coast
- Coordinates: 6°34′N 8°18′W
- Country: Ivory Coast
- District: Montagnes
- Region: Cavally
- Department: Toulépleu

Population (2014)
  - Total: 10,835
- Time zone: UTC+0 (GMT)

Péhé is a town in the far west of Ivory Coast, near the border with Liberia. It is a sub-prefecture of Toulépleu Department in Cavally Region, Montagnes District.

Péhé was a commune until March 2012, when it became one of 1,126 communes nationwide that were abolished.

In 2014, the population of the sub-prefecture of Péhé was 10,835.

== Villages ==
The nine villages of the sub-prefecture of Péhé and their population in 2014 are:

1. Bohibli (1,194)
2. Diaibli (673)
3. Dénan (1,920)
4. Glakon-Bloc (214)
5. Kpobli-Douozé (937)
6. Mayoubli (1,030)
7. Pantrokin (835)
8. Péhé (2,538)
9. Tahibli (1,494)
