= Mud ring feeding =

Dolphin behaviour

Mud ring feeding (or mud plume fishing) is a cooperative feeding behavior seen in bottlenose dolphins on the lower Atlantic coast of Florida, United States, and guiana dolphins, on the Estuarine-Lagoon Complex of Cananéia, south São Paulo State, southeastern Brazil. Dolphins use this hunting technique to forage and trap fish. A single dolphin will swim in a circle around a group of fish, swiftly moving his tail along the sand to create a plume. This creates a temporary net around the fish and they become disoriented. The fish begin jumping above the surface, so the dolphins can lunge through the plume and catch the fish.

== Strategy ==
1. Single dolphin in the group will begin to swim with his tail moving along the sand; initial appearance of suspended sediment will appear
2. As the dolphin moves in a circle, the plume begins to grow
3. Cessation of plume growth and repositioning of dolphins in orientation to the plume
4. Dolphin lunges through the plume into the group of trapped fish

Mud ring feeding was first observed in 1999 in a group of 18 dolphins. An appearance of a thick cloud of suspended sediment on the surface of the water was noticed. The sediment plume then grows linearly or curvilinearly and the dolphin is observed to lead at the edge of the plume rather than just ahead. Lengths of the plume are estimated to be between 5.4 and 10.8 metres (18 and 35 ft). The entire behavior is observed to last an average of 17.0 seconds from the initiation of the mud plume through the final lunge. In all cases of the behavior, it is performed by a single animal and the plume is used once; though it has been seen that simultaneous plumes can be created separately by other dolphins in the group.

== See also ==
- Lords of the Rings: Mud ring feeding by bottlenose dolphins in a Caribbean estuary revealed from sea, air, and space
- Rings of Power: evidence of mud ring feeding performed by Guiana dolphins
- Bubble net
- List of feeding behaviours
- Cooperative hunting
- Predation
- Pack hunter
