= Méo =

- Town and sub-prefecture
- Location in Ivory Coast
- Coordinates: 6°31′N 8°18′W
- Country: Ivory Coast
- District: Montagnes
- Region: Cavally
- Department: Toulépleu

Population (2014)
  - Total: 14,755
- Time zone: UTC+0 (GMT)

Méo is a town in the far west of Ivory Coast, near the border with Liberia. It is a sub-prefecture of Toulépleu Department in Cavally Region, Montagnes District.

Méo was a commune until March 2012, when it became one of 1,126 communes nationwide that were abolished.

In 2014, the population of the sub-prefecture of Méo was 14,755.

== Villages ==
The nine villages of the sub-prefecture of Méo and their population in 2014 are:

1. Bohobli (2,565)
2. Diai (2,864)
3. Douhozon (465)
4. Grié 1 (573)
5. Grié 2 (890)
6. Méo (2 652)
7. Pahoubli (3,647)
8. Panhoulo (361)
9. Sahoubli (738)
