= Doké =

- Town and sub-prefecture
- Location in Ivory Coast
- Coordinates: 6°36′N 8°7′W
- Country: Ivory Coast
- District: Montagnes
- Region: Cavally
- Department: Bloléquin

Population (2014)
  - Total: 13,357
- Time zone: UTC+0 (GMT)

Doké is a town in western Ivory Coast. It is a sub-prefecture of Bloléquin Department in Cavally Region, Montagnes District.

Doké was a commune until March 2012, when it became one of 1,126 communes nationwide that were abolished.

In 2014, the population of the sub-prefecture of Doké was 13,357.

== Villages ==
The nine villages of the sub-prefecture of Doké and their population in 2014 are:

1. Bably-Vaya (1,318)
2. Diéya (579)
3. Doké (5,479)
4. Ganhia (668)
5. Guibobly (1,155)
6. Ké-Bouébo (884)
7. Oulai-Kpabli (924)
8. Pohan-Badouébly (865)
9. Zomplou (1,485)
