= Guiglo Airport =

Airport in Montagnes, Ivory Coast

- IATA: GGO; ICAO: DIGL

Summary
- Airport type: Public
- Serves: Guiglo
- Elevation AMSL: 722 ft / 220 m
- Coordinates: 6°32′0″N 7°31′30″W

Map

Runways
Direction	Length		Surface
Direction	ft	m	Surface
04/22	4,920	1,500	Unpaved
- Source: Google Maps

Guiglo Airport (IATA: GGO, ICAO: DIGL) is an airport serving Guiglo, Côte d'Ivoire.

== See also ==
- Transport in Côte d'Ivoire
