= Wild Chimpanzee Foundation =

Nonprofit organization

The Wild Chimpanzee Foundation is a multinational organization safeguarding chimpanzees; it was founded in 2000 by the primatologist Christophe Boesch, in Switzerland. It currently runs programs in Ivory Coast, Guinea, Sierra Leone and Liberia, in partnership with the Max Planck Institute for Evolutionary Anthropology.
