= Bloléquin Department =

Coordinates: 6°34′N 8°0′W

Bloléquin Department Département de Bloléquin
- Department
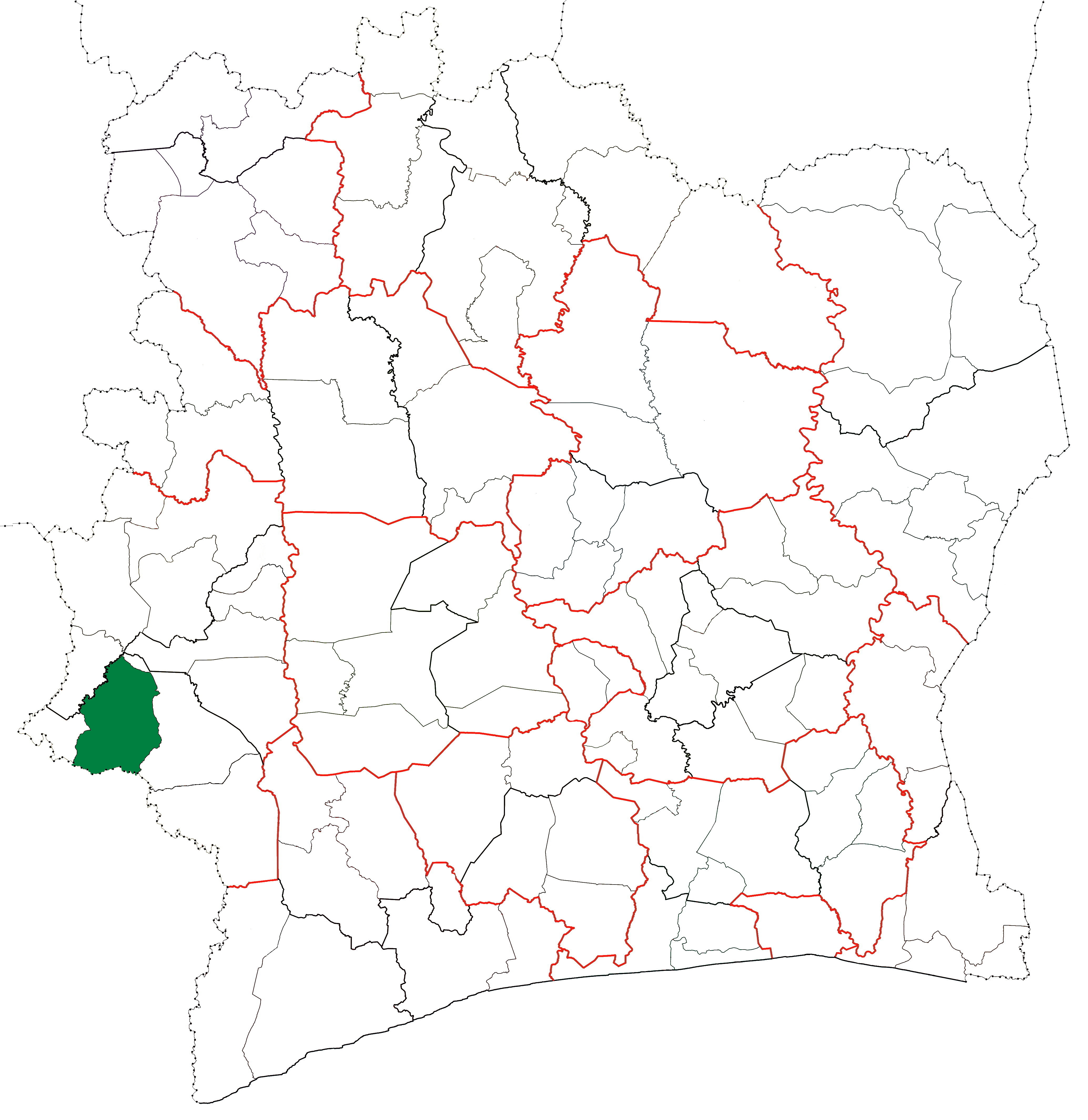
- Location in Ivory Coast. Bloléquin Department has retained the same boundaries since its creation in 2005.
- Country: Ivory Coast
- District: Montagnes
- Region: Cavally
- 2005: Established as a second-level subdivision via a division of Guiglo Dept
- 2011: Converted to a third-level subdivision
- Departmental seat: Bloléquin

Government
  - Prefect: Yao Dinard Kouakou

Area
  - Total: 2,980 km^{2} (1,150 sq mi)

Population (2021 census)
  - Total: 237,944
  - Density: 79.8/km^{2} (207/sq mi)
- Time zone: UTC+0 (GMT)

Bloléquin Department is a department of Cavally Region in Montagnes District, Ivory Coast. In 2021, its population was 237,944 and its seat is the settlement of Bloléquin. The sub-prefectures of the department are Bloléquin, Diboké, Doké, Tinhou, and Zéaglo.

== History ==
Bloléquin Department was created in 2005 as a second-level subdivision via a split-off from Guiglo Department. At its creation, it was part of Moyen-Cavally Region.

In 2011, districts were introduced as new first-level subdivisions of Ivory Coast. At the same time, regions were reorganised and became second-level subdivisions and all departments were converted into third-level subdivisions. At this time, Bloléquin Department became part of Cavally Region in Montagnes District.
