= Guiglo =

- City, sub-prefecture, and commune
- Location in Ivory Coast
- Coordinates: 6°33′N 7°29′W
- Country: Ivory Coast
- District: Montagnes
- Region: Cavally
- Department: Guiglo

Area
  - Total: 1,930 km^{2} (750 sq mi)

Population (2021 census)
  - Total: 171,454
  - Density: 88.8/km^{2} (230/sq mi)
  - City: 52,544
- (2014 census)
- Time zone: UTC+0 (GMT)

Guiglo is a city in western Ivory Coast. It is a sub-prefecture of and the seat of Guiglo Department. It is also a commune and the seat of Cavally Region in Montagnes District. Guiglo is located on the Nzo River, a tributary of the Sassandra River. In the 2014 census, the city had a population of 52,544.

Guiglo is a market centre of the Guere, Yacouba and Mossi people, with trade in rice, livestock, and cassava predominating. The city is also a collecting depot, or entrepot, for coffee and timber that is taken to coastal ports for export. Guiglo is the site of both a research station and a sawmill.

In 2005, a United Nations base was invaded by 1,000 protesters. The protestors took control but were forced back by armed UN peacekeepers. The clash left 100 protesters and one UN peacekeeper dead.

The city is served by Guiglo Airport.

In 2021, the population of the sub-prefecture of Guiglo was 171,454.

== Villages ==
The 18 villages of the sub-prefecture of Guiglo and their population in 2014 are:

1. Domobly (5 128)
2. Glopaoudy (2 157)
3. Goya 1 (5 129)
4. Goya 2 (2 386)
5. Guiglo (52 544)
6. Kati (1 130)
7. Mona (2 405)
8. Nedrou (816)
9. Yaoudé (10 482)
10. Zouan (9 931)
11. Ditroudra-Béoué (2 100)
12. Kridy (2 652)
13. Nounoubaye (750)
14. Paris-Léona (2 365)
15. Petit-Guiglo (1 656)
16. Pona (2 012)
17. Troya (6 954)
18. Zro (3 199)
