= Christophe Boesch =

French-Swiss primatologist (1951–2024)

Christophe Boesch (11 August 1951 – 14 January 2024) was a French-Swiss primatologist who studied chimpanzees. He and his wife, Hedwige Boesch-Ackermann, worked together, co-wrote articles and co-directed documentaries about chimpanzees.

== Biography ==
Boesch was born in St. Gallen, Switzerland on 11 August 1951. He was of French and Swiss nationality. Boesch received his degree in biology from the University of Geneva, and his Ph.D. from the University of Zurich in 1984 under the supervision of Professor Hans Kummer. His dissertation was entitled "Nut-Cracking Behaviour of Wild Chimpanzees". After five years of post-doctoral support from the Swiss NSF, he joined the group of Professor Stephen Stearns at the University of Basel as an Assistent, where he habilitated in 1994.

Boesch's first field experience was in 1973, conducting census work on the mountain gorillas of Virunga National Park in Rwanda, under the supervision of Dian Fossey.

In 1975 and 1977, he taught at a secondary school in Geneva; followed by time as an assistant in the Department of Ethology and Wildlife Research at the University of Zurich.

In 1976, Boesch began his work with chimpanzees at Taï National Park in Côte d'Ivoire. One of his ongoing projects was begun in 1979, studying the "ecology, social organization, tool-use, hunting, cooperation, food-sharing, inter-community relationships, and cognitive capacities" of the chimpanzees at Taï National Park.

In 1997, he was appointed the founding Director of the Department of Primatology of the Max Planck Institute for Evolutionary Anthropology in Leipzig, Germany. He was also the founder and president of the Wild Chimpanzee Foundation.

Boesch died on 14 January 2024, at the age of 72.

== Discoveries and other contributions ==
Boesh is largely known for his work in the field studying chimpanzees. In his book Wild Cultures: A Comparison between Chimpanzee and Human Cultures (2012), he argued for the importance of studying the traditions and habits that animals learn and use in their groups. Boesch found that the cognitive complexity of chimpanzees is underestimated, for example, in their abilities to cooperate, teach their young or use tools. He also observed that chimpanzee behavior in captivity tended to have little relevance to understanding their behavior in the wild.

Through his conservation activities in West Africa, he helped to create national parks in Liberia and Guinea and protected areas in the Côte d'Ivoire and Sierra Leone.

Boesch and several other scientists found evidence about how easily disease can be passed from human tourists and researchers to the great apes; this research has helped to make great ape tourism more hygienic.

Boesch and his colleagues at the Max Planck Institute for Evolutionary Anthropology have also contributed to our understanding of chimpanzee mating habits through collection and analysis of chimpanzee DNA.

== Video ==
- Video on Christophe Boesch's research (Latest Thinking)
