= Toulépleu Department =

Coordinates: 6°35′N 8°25′W

Toulépleu Department Département de Toulépleu
- Department
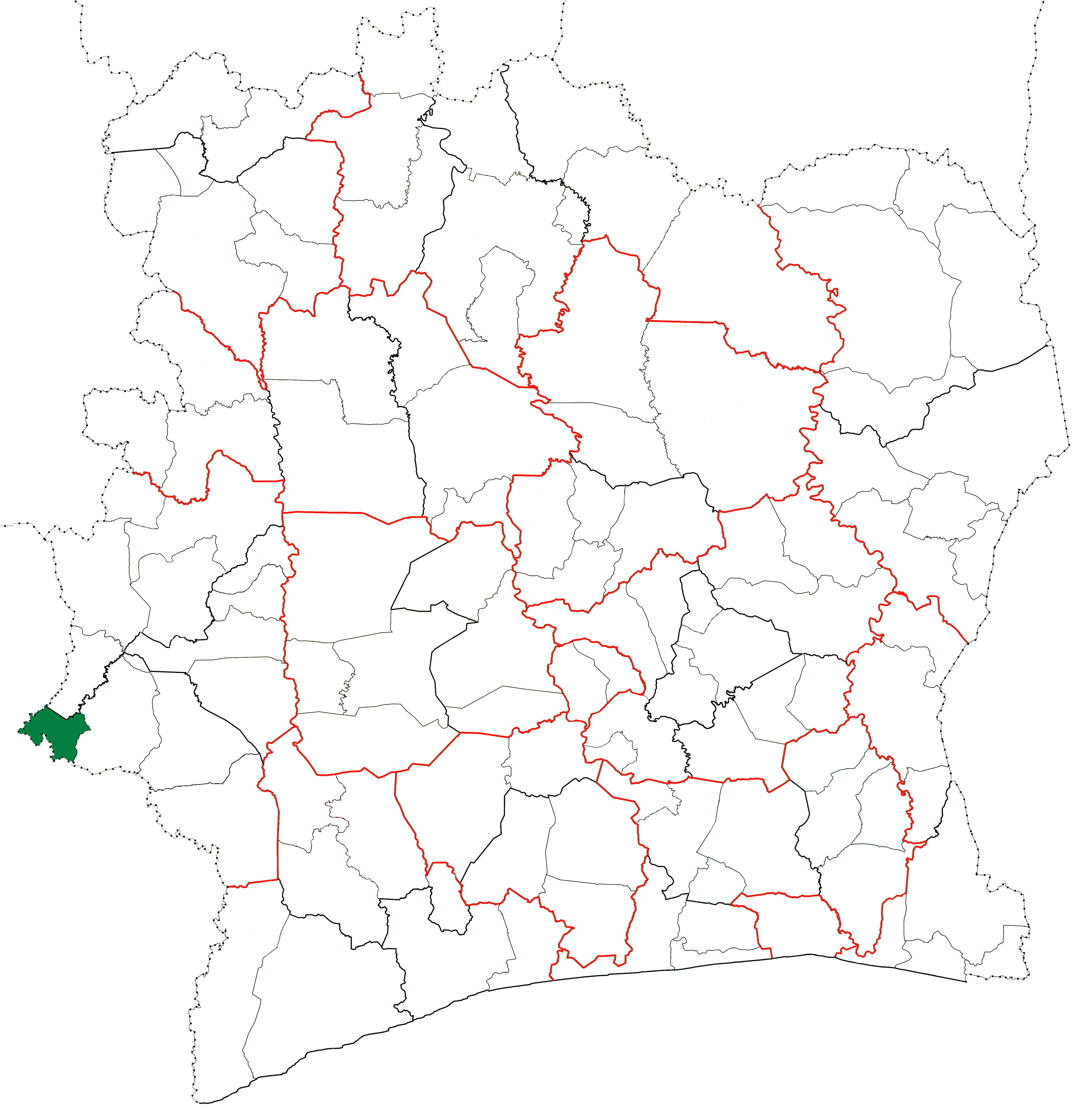
- Location in Ivory Coast. Toulépleu Department has retained the same boundaries since its creation in 1998.
- Country: Ivory Coast
- District: Montagnes
- Region: Cavally
- 1998: Established as a second-level subdivision via a division of Guiglo Dept
- 2000: Transferred to the new Moyen-Cavally Region
- 2011: Converted to a third-level subdivision
- Departmental seat: Toulépleu

Government
  - Prefect: Karim Diarra

Area
  - Total: 809 km^{2} (312 sq mi)

Population (2021 census)
  - Total: 93,529
  - Density: 116/km^{2} (299/sq mi)
- Time zone: UTC+0 (GMT)

Toulépleu Department is a department of Cavally Region in Montagnes District, Ivory Coast. In 2021, its population was 93,529 and its seat is the settlement of Toulépleu. The sub-prefectures of the department are Bakoubli, Méo, Nézobly, Péhé, Tiobly, and Toulépleu. It is the westernmost department of Ivory Coast.

== History ==
Toulépleu Department was created in 1998 as a second-level subdivision via a split-off from Guiglo Department. At its creation, it was part of Dix-Huit Montagnes Region. In 2000, Toulépleu Department was transferred to the newly created Moyen-Cavally Region.

In 2011, districts were introduced as new first-level subdivisions of Ivory Coast. At the same time, regions were reorganised and became second-level subdivisions and all departments were converted into third-level subdivisions. At this time, Toulépleu Department became part of Cavally Region in Montagnes District.
