= Taï Department =

Coordinates: 5°52′N 7°27′W

Taï Department Département de Taï
- Department
- Location (dark green) in Cavally region (light green) and Montagnes district (orange) in Ivory Coast. Taï Department has retained the same boundaries since its creation in 2013.
- Country: Ivory Coast
- District: Montagnes
- Region: Cavally
- 2013: Established via a division of Guiglo Dept
- Departmental seat: Taï

Government
  - Prefect: Aka Kassi Bio

Area
  - Total: 4,220 km^{2} (1,630 sq mi)

Population (2021 census)
  - Total: 117,387
  - Density: 27.8/km^{2} (72.0/sq mi)
- Time zone: UTC+0 (GMT)

Taï Department is a department of Cavally Region in Montagnes District, Ivory Coast. In 2021, its population was 117,387 and its seat is the settlement of Taï. The sub-prefectures of the department are Taï and Zagné.

== History ==
Taï Department was created in 2013 by dividing Guiglo Department. Ongoing instability in the south-western portion of the country prompted the creation of the department.
