= Guiglo Department =

Coordinates: 6°33′N 7°29′W

Guiglo Department Département de Guiglo
- Department
- Location in Ivory Coast. Guiglo Department has had these boundaries since 2013.
- Country: Ivory Coast
- Region: Cavally
- 1969: Established as a first-level subdivision
- 1985: Divided to create Duékoué Dept
- 1991: Converted to a second-level subdivision
- 1996: Divided to create Toulépleu Dept
- 2000: Transferred to the new Moyen-Cavally Region
- 2005: Divided to create Bloléquin Dept
- 2011: Converted to a third-level subdivision
- 2013: Divided to create Taï Dept
- Departmental seat: Guiglo

Government
  - Prefect: Koné Messamba

Area
  - Total: 3,280 km^{2} (1,270 sq mi)

Population (2021 census)
  - Total: 259,381
  - Density: 79.1/km^{2} (205/sq mi)
- Time zone: UTC+0 (GMT)

Guiglo Department is a department of Cavally Region in Montagnes District, Ivory Coast. In 2021, its population was 259,381 and its seat is the settlement of Guiglo. The sub-prefectures of the department are Bédy-Goazon, Guiglo, Kaadé, and Nizahon.

== History ==
Guiglo Department was created in 1969 as one of the 24 new departments that were created to take the place of the six departments that were being abolished. It was created from territory that was formerly part of Ouest Department. Using current boundaries as a reference, from 1969 to 1988 the department occupied the same territory as Cavally Region plus Duékoué Department of Guémon Region. This territory was organised into Moyen-Cavally Region in 2000.

In 1985, Guiglo Department was split in two in order to create Duékoué Department. In 1991, regions were introduced as new first-level subdivisions of Ivory Coast; as a result, all departments were converted into second-level subdivisions. Guiglo Department was included in the West Region, renamed Dix-Huit Montagnes Region in 1997.

Guiglo Department was divided again in 1996 to create Toulépleu Department. In 2000, it was included in the newly formed Moyen-Cavally Region.

A third division of Guiglo Department occurred in 2005 with the splitting-off of Bloléquin Department.

In 2011, districts were introduced as new first-level subdivisions of Ivory Coast. At the same time, regions were reorganised and became second-level subdivisions and all departments were converted into third-level subdivisions. At this time, Guiglo Department became part of Cavally Region in Montagnes District.

Guiglo Department was divided for a fourth time in 2013 when two sub-prefectures were removed from it to create Taï Department.

=== Maps of historical boundaries ===
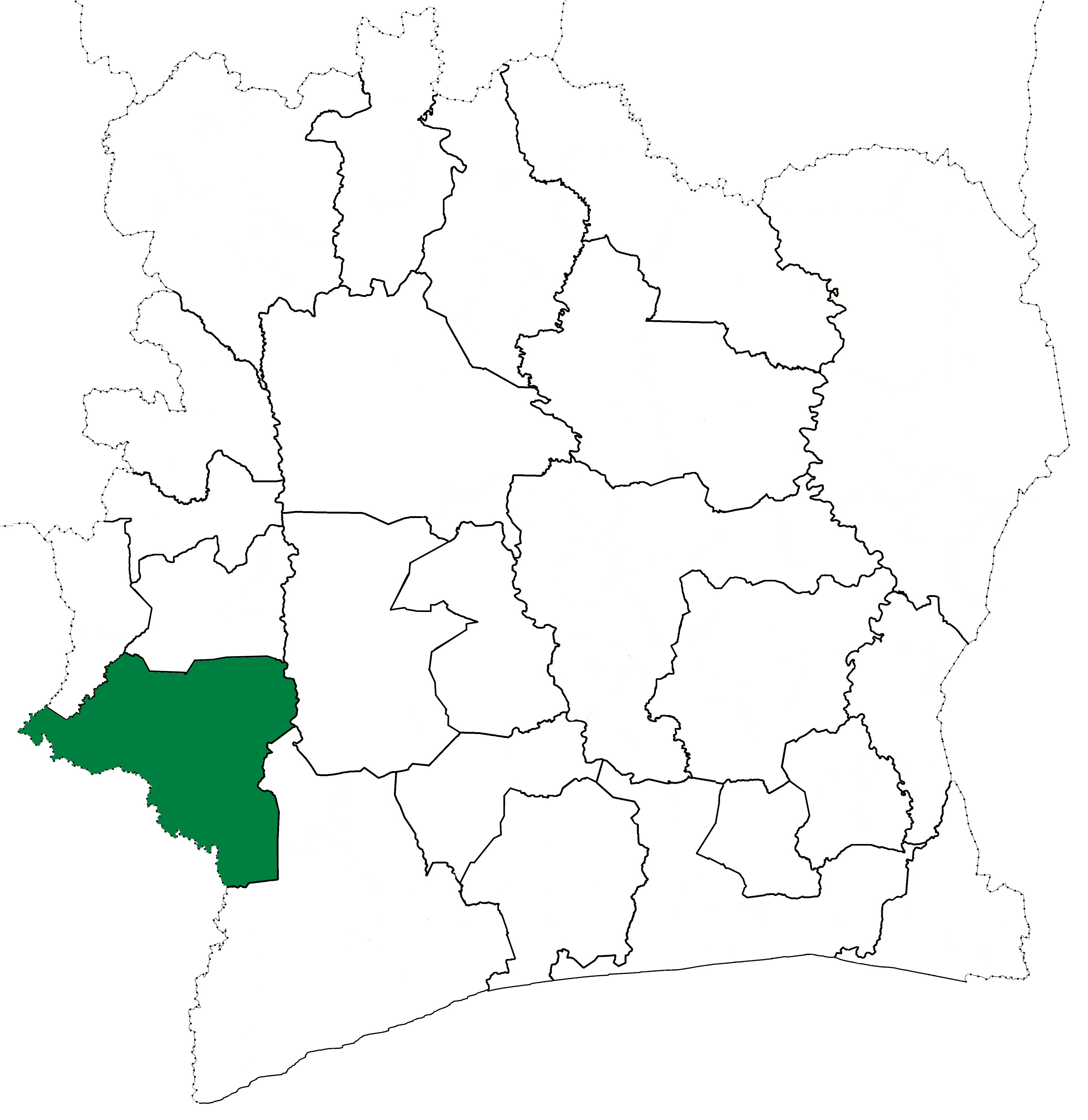
Guiglo Department upon its creation in 1969. It kept these boundaries until 1988, but other departments began to be divided in 1974.

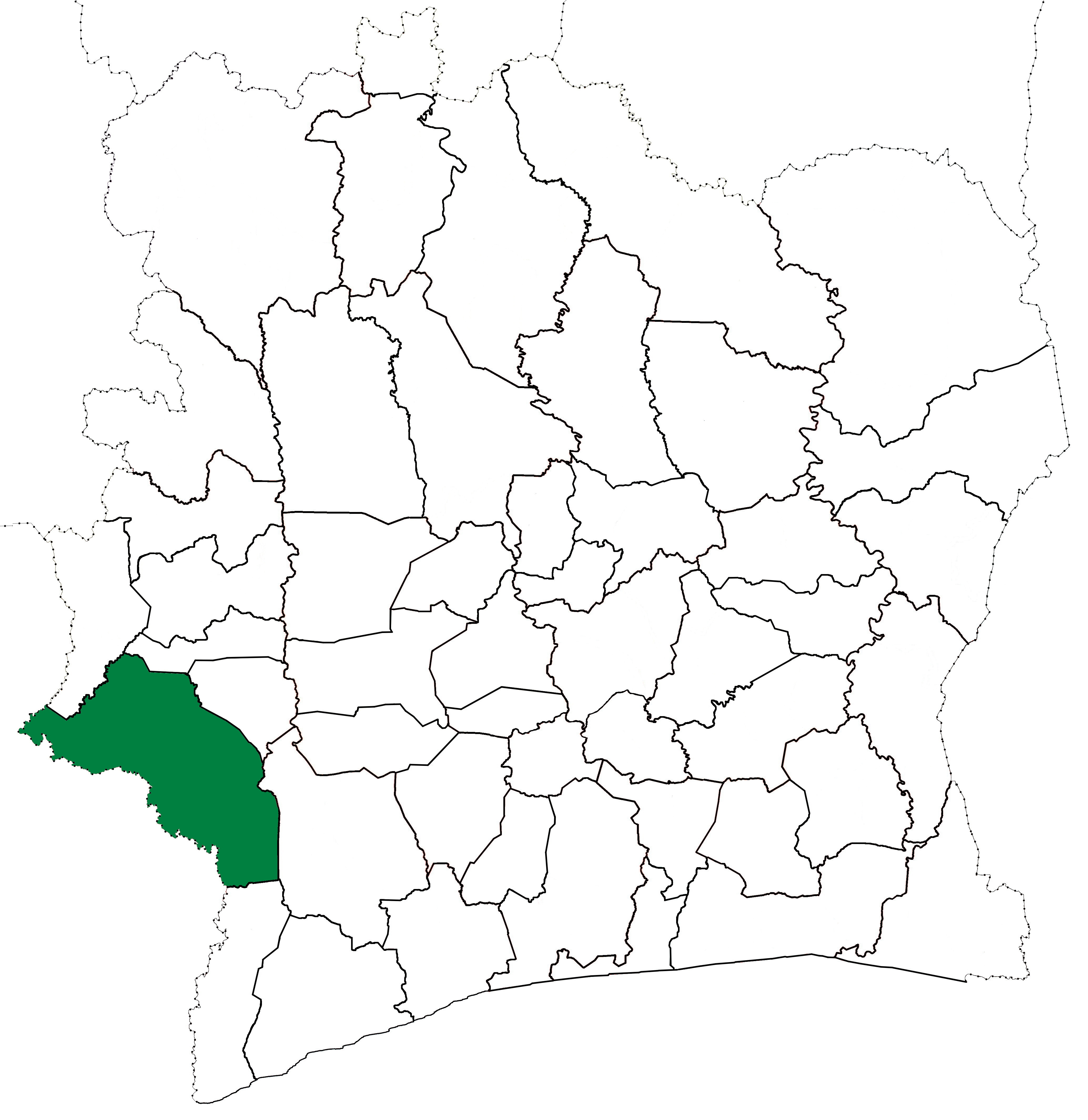
Guiglo Department from 1988 to 1998. (Other departments began to be divided in 1995.)

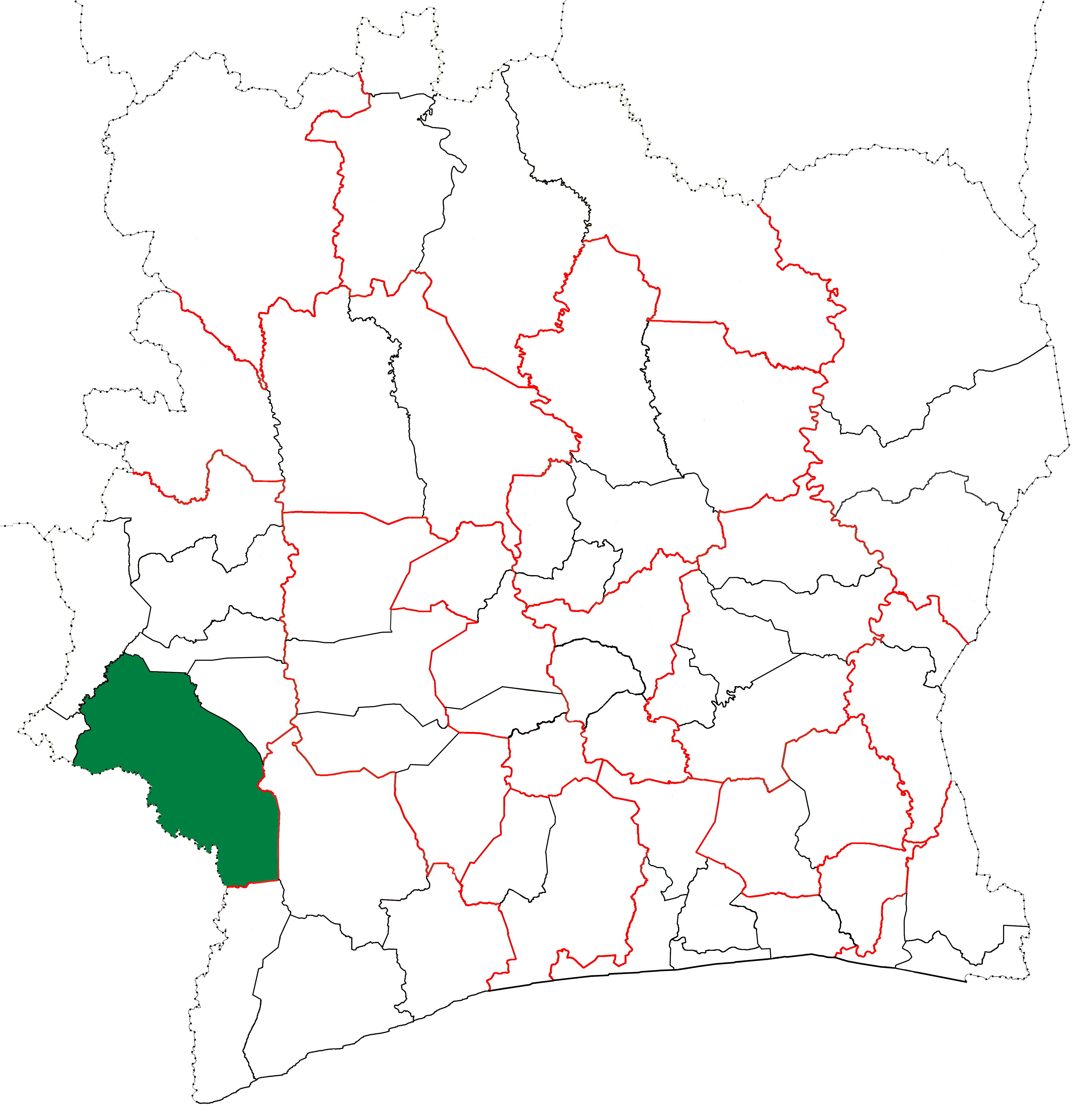
Guiglo Department from 1998 to 2005. (Other subdivision boundaries began to change in 2000.)

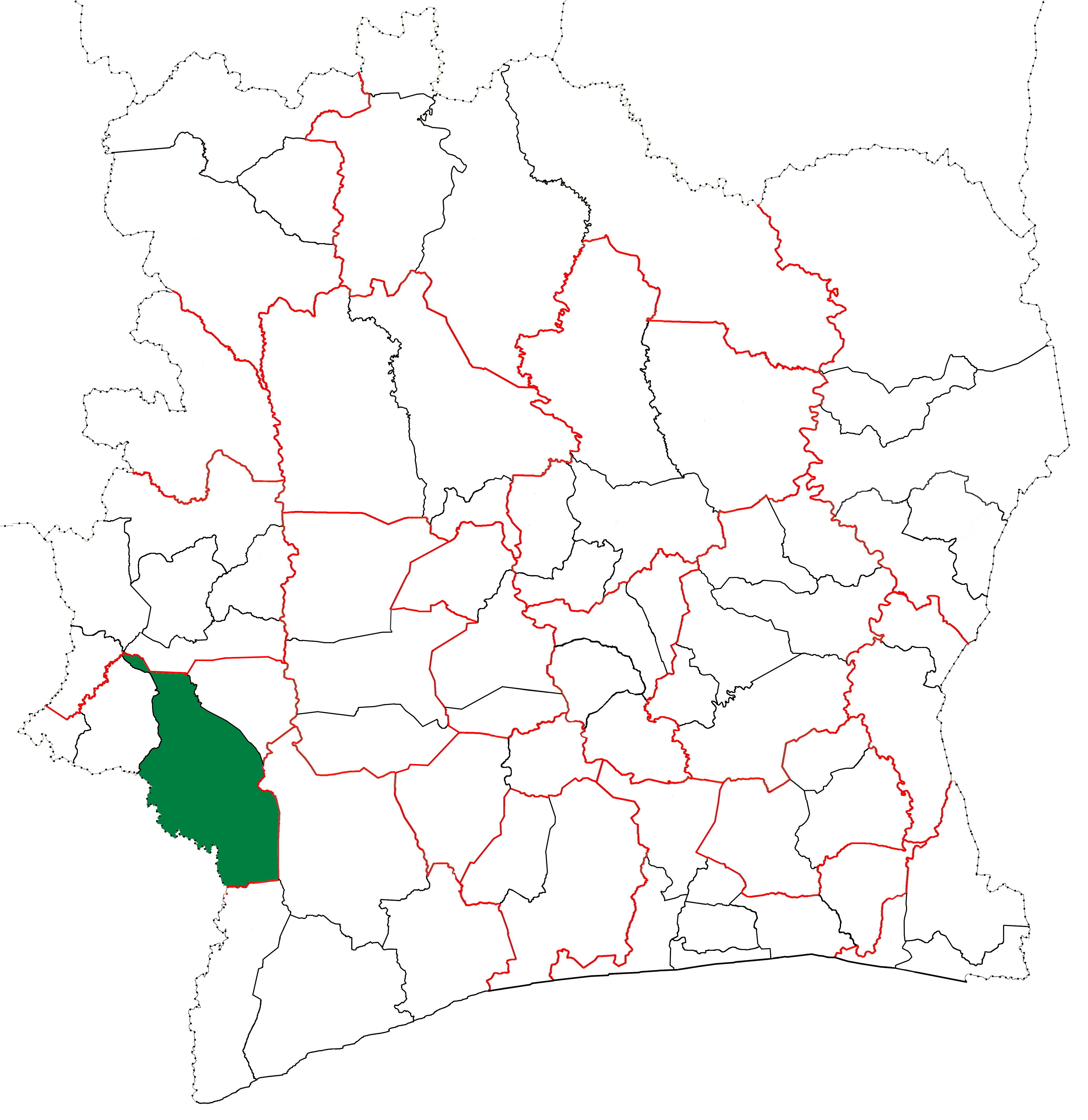
Guiglo Department from 2005 to 2008. (Other subdivision boundaries began to change in 2008.)

Guiglo Department from 2008 to 2012. (Other subdivision boundaries began to change in 2008.)
