= Cavally Region =

Coordinates: 6°33′N 7°29′W

Cavally Region Région du Cavally
- Region
- Seal
- Motto: "Paix-Union-Développement"
- Location of Cavally Region with its departments: Toulépleu Department Bloléquin Department Guiglo Department Taï Department
- Country: Ivory Coast
- District: Montagnes
- Established: 2011
- Regional seat: Guiglo

Government
  - Prefect: Koné Messamba
  - Council President: Dagobert Banzio

Area
  - Total: 11,280 km^{2} (4,360 sq mi)

Population (2021 census)
  - Total: 708,241
  - Density: 62.79/km^{2} (162.6/sq mi)
- Time zone: UTC+0 (GMT)
- Website: cavally.org

Cavally Region is one of the 31 regions of Ivory Coast. From its establishment in 2011, to 2014 it was in Montagnes District. The seat of the region is Guiglo and the region's population in the 2021 census was 708,241.

Cavally is currently divided into four departments: Bloléquin, Guiglo, Taï, and Toulépleu.
