= Environment of Ivory Coast =

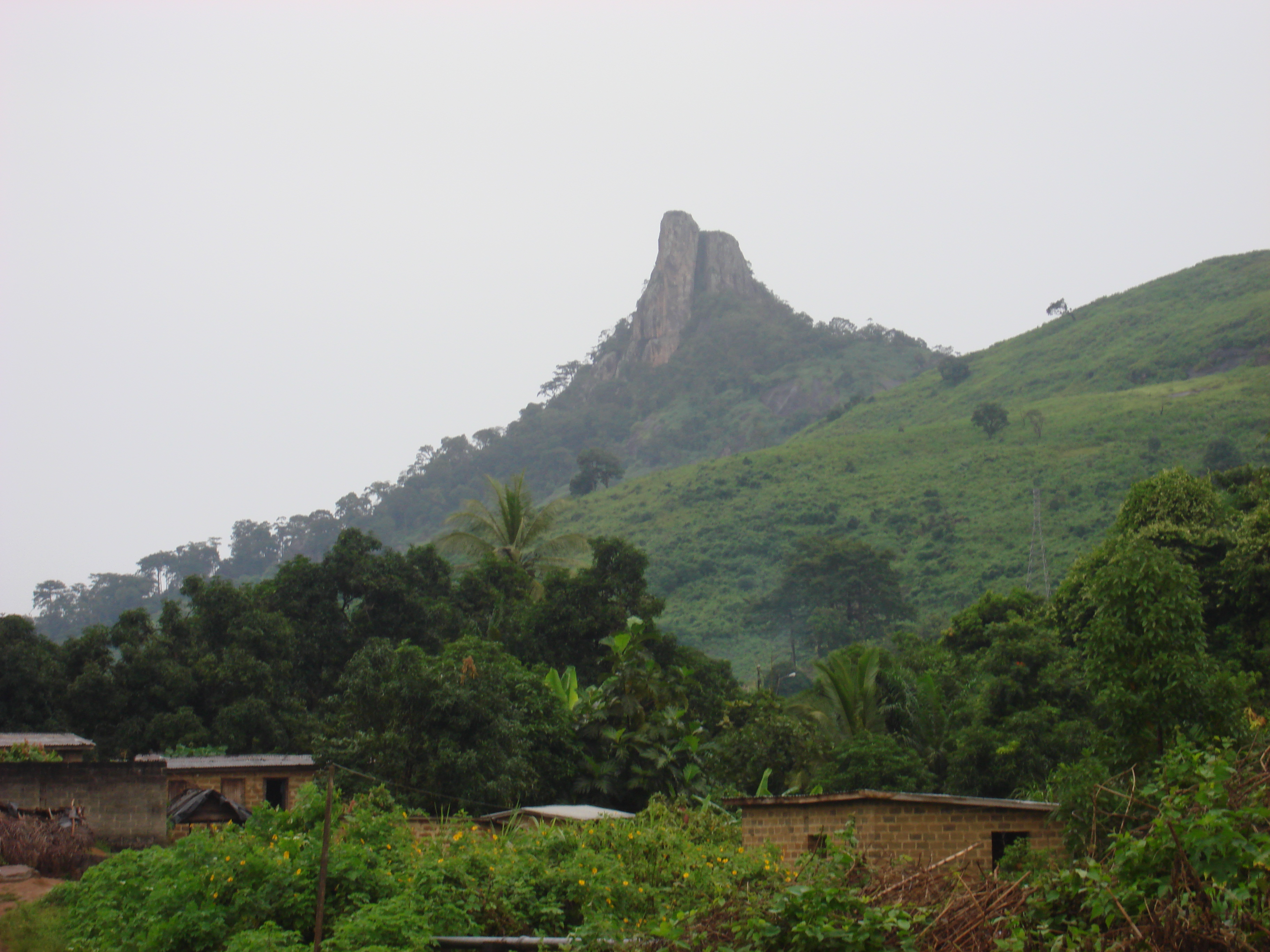
A volcanic plug in Man

The environment of Côte d'Ivoire has more than 1,200 animal species—223 mammal, 702 bird, 125 reptile, 38 amphibian, and 111 fish species—and 4,700 plant species. It is the most biodiverse country in West Africa, but unlike other countries there, its diversity isn't concentrated along the coast, but rather in the rugged interior. However, much like the rest of West Africa, Côte d'Ivoire has suffered severe deforestation.

== Protected areas ==
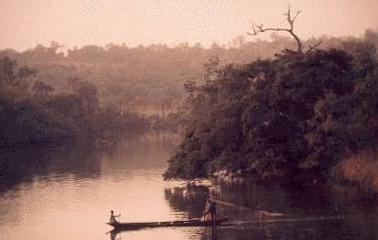

- Assagny National Park
- Banco National Park
- Comoé National Park
- Îles Ehotilés National Park
- Marahoué National Park
- Mont Nimba National Park
- Mont Péko National Park
- Mont Sângbé National Park
- Taï National Park

== Treaties and international agreements ==
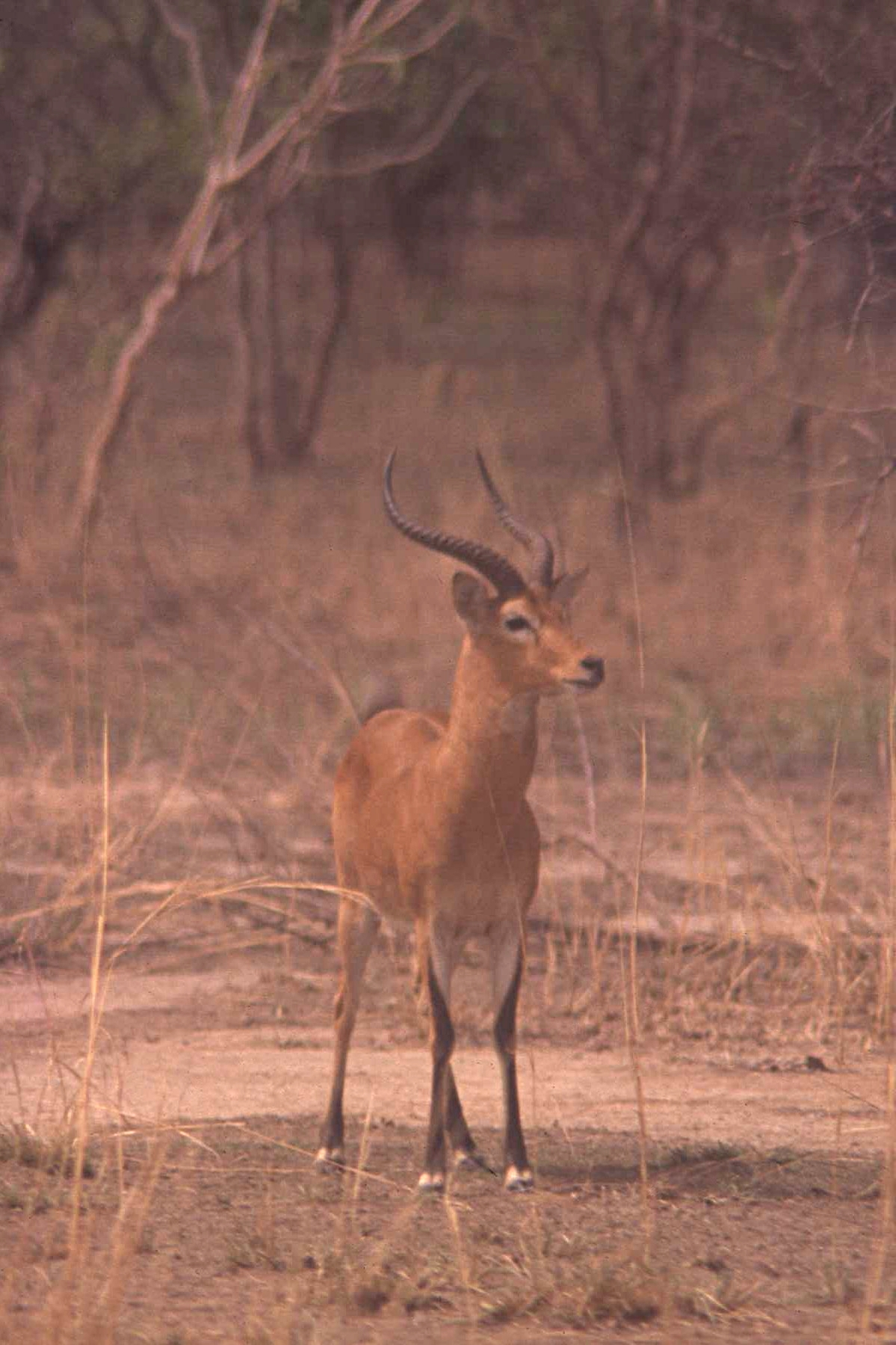

Côte d'Ivoire is party to the following treaties:

- Convention on Biological Diversity
- United Nations Framework Convention on Climate Change
- United Nations Convention to Combat Desertification
- Convention on the International Trade in Endangered Species of Wild Flora and Fauna
- Basel Convention on hazardous wastes
- United Nations Convention on the Law of the Sea
- Convention on the Prevention of Marine Pollution by Dumping of Wastes and Other Matter
- Comprehensive Test Ban Treaty on nuclear testing
- Montreal Protocol on ozone depletion
- MARPOL 73/78 on ship pollution
- International Tropical Timber Agreement, 1983
- International Tropical Timber Agreement, 1994
- Ramsar Convention on wetland conservation

== Environmental issues ==
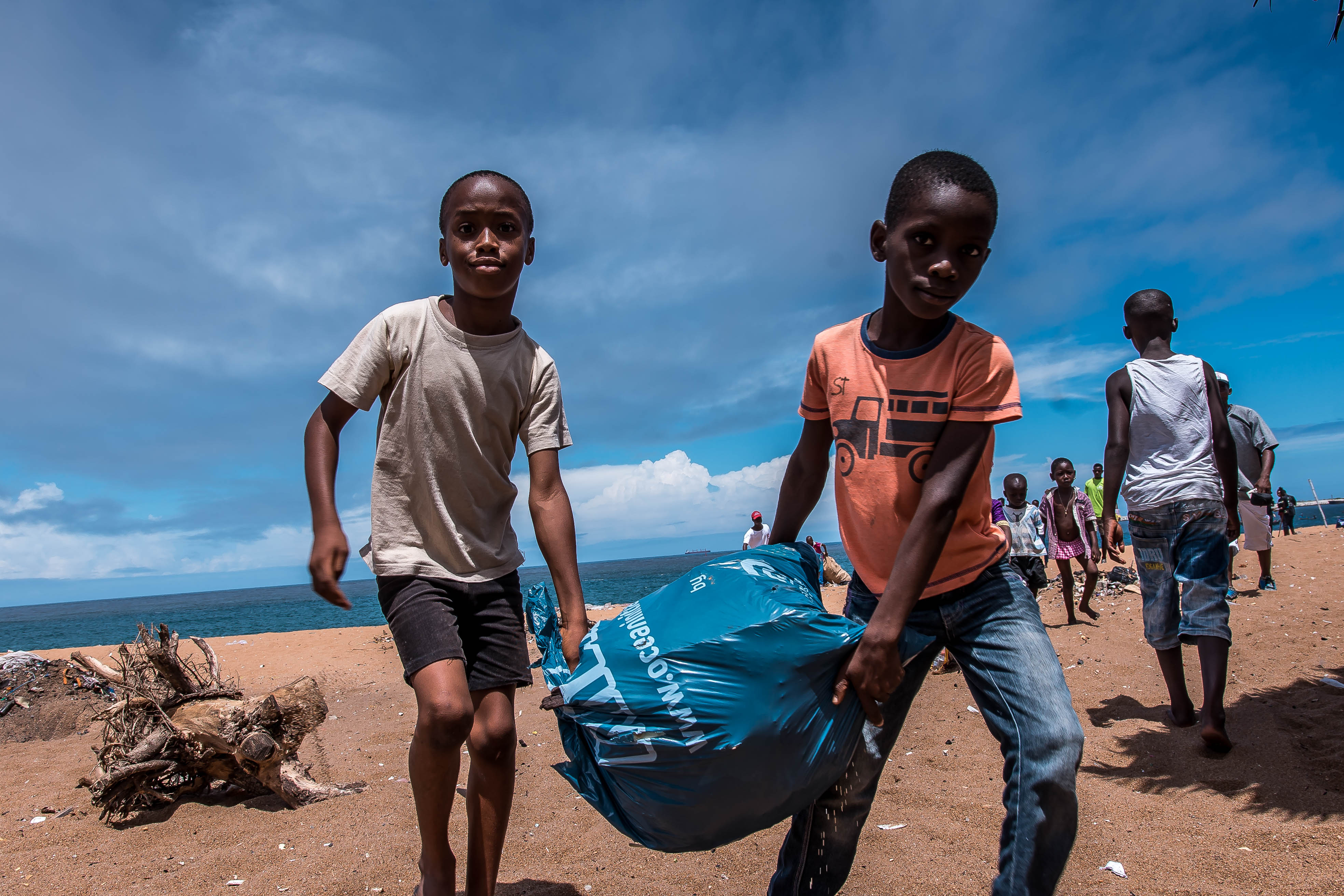
Children helping to clean beaches

=== Historic ===
The 2006 Côte d'Ivoire toxic waste dump was a health crisis in which Trafigura illegally dumped toxic waste in up to 12 sites around Abidjan in August 2006.

=== Current ===
Palm oil is one of the commodities exported by Côte d'Ivoire and the plantations have an environmental impact. Palmci, the main palm oil company, said that environmentalists had caused it to abandon plans for a palm oil plantation in the Tanoe forest wetlands.

Ivory Coast had a 2018 Forest Landscape Integrity Index mean score of 3.64/10, ranking it 143rd globally out of 172 countries.

== See also ==
- List of environmental issues
