= List of national parks of Ivory Coast =

The country of Côte d'Ivoire in Africa has the following national parks and other protected areas.

== National parks ==
- Assagny National Park
- Banco National Park
- Comoé National Park
- Îles Ehotilés National Park
- Marahoué National Park
- Mont Péko National Park
- Mont Sângbé National Park
- Taï National Park

== See also ==
- Mount Nimba Strict Nature Reserve
