= Gbablasso =

- Village
- Location in Ivory Coast
- Coordinates: 7°46′N 7°42′W
- Country: Ivory Coast
- District: Montagnes
- Region: Tonkpi
- Department: Biankouma
- Sub-prefecture: Biankouma
- Time zone: UTC+0 (GMT)

Gbablasso is a village in western Ivory Coast. It is in the sub-prefecture of Biankouma, Biankouma Department, Tonkpi Region, Montagnes District.

Gbablasso was a commune until March 2012, but it, along with 1,125 other communes nationwide, were abolished.
