= Monts du Toura =

Mountain range in Ivory Coast

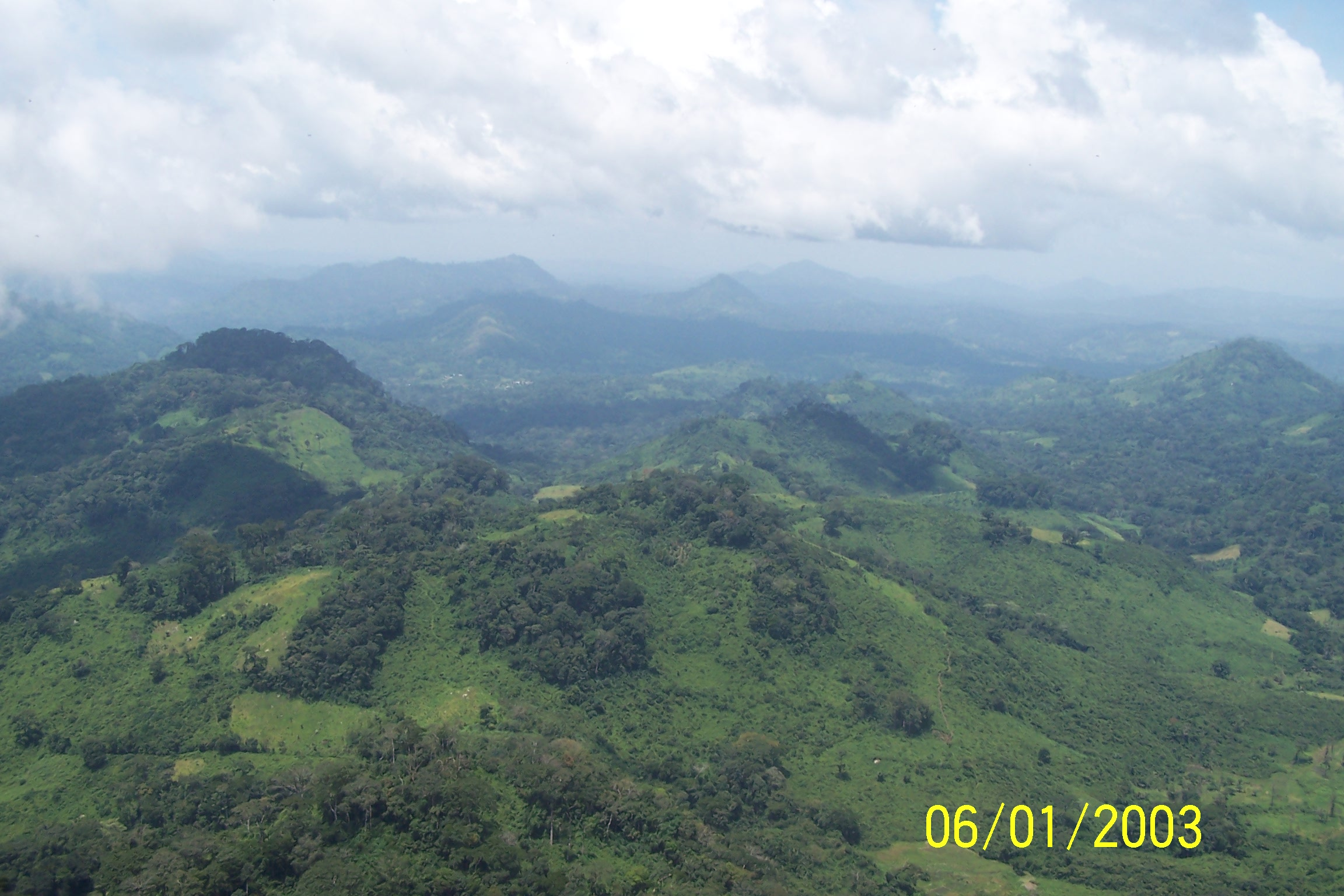
"Monts du Toura: A mountain range in Ivory Coast, reaching up to 1,300 meters, with Mont Nimba rising to 1,752 meters."

The Monts du Toura, also known as the Toura Mountains, are a range of mountains rising to 1300 metres in elevation, extending westward across Ivory Coast from the Sassandra River to the border with Liberia and Guinea. Mont Nimba, at the western end of the range, reaches 1,752 m.

The Mont Sangbé National Park, one of the world's principal national parks, covering an area of 95,000 ha (950 km^{2}/360 sq m) north of Man and west of the Sassandra, between Biankouma and Touba, is located entirely within the Toura mountains (including 14 peaks over 1000 m). The park is very densely vegetated savanna woodland with wildlife populations of elephants, buffaloes, warthog, antelopes, and monkeys.

Other protected areas include the Gueoule and Mont Glo forest reserves.
