= Kpata =

- Town and sub-prefecture
- Location in Ivory Coast
- Coordinates: 7°43′N 7°33′W
- Country: Ivory Coast
- District: Montagnes
- Region: Tonkpi
- Department: Biankouma

Population (2014)
  - Total: 6,741
- Time zone: UTC+0 (GMT)

Kpata is a town in western Ivory Coast. It is a sub-prefecture of Biankouma Department in Tonkpi Region, Montagnes District.

Kpata was a commune until March 2012, when it became one of 1,126 communes nationwide that were abolished.

In 2014, the population of the sub-prefecture of Kpata was 6,741.

== Villages ==
The 13 villages of the sub-prefecture of Kpata and their population in 2014 are:

1. Bénomba (282)
2. Dantomba (422)
3. Digoualé (824)
4. Gaoté (554)
5. Gbagouiné (547)
6. Gbonogouélé (98)
7. Gboyoué (416)
8. Gbégui (140)
9. Kpata (1,580)
10. Loualéba (572)
11. Nimbo-Sama (541)
12. Ouindié (86)
13. Yaloba (679)
