= Gaoté =

- Village
- Location in Ivory Coast
- Coordinates: 7°43′N 7°29′W
- Country: Ivory Coast
- District: Montagnes
- Region: Tonkpi
- Department: Biankouma
- Sub-prefecture: Kpata
- Time zone: UTC+0 (GMT)

Gaoté is a village in western Ivory Coast. It is in the sub-prefecture of Kpata, Biankouma Department, Tonkpi Region, Montagnes District.

Gaoté was a commune until March 2012, when it became one of 1,126 communes nationwide that were abolished.
