= Îles Ehotilé National Park =

National park in the Ivory Coast

- IUCN category II (national park)
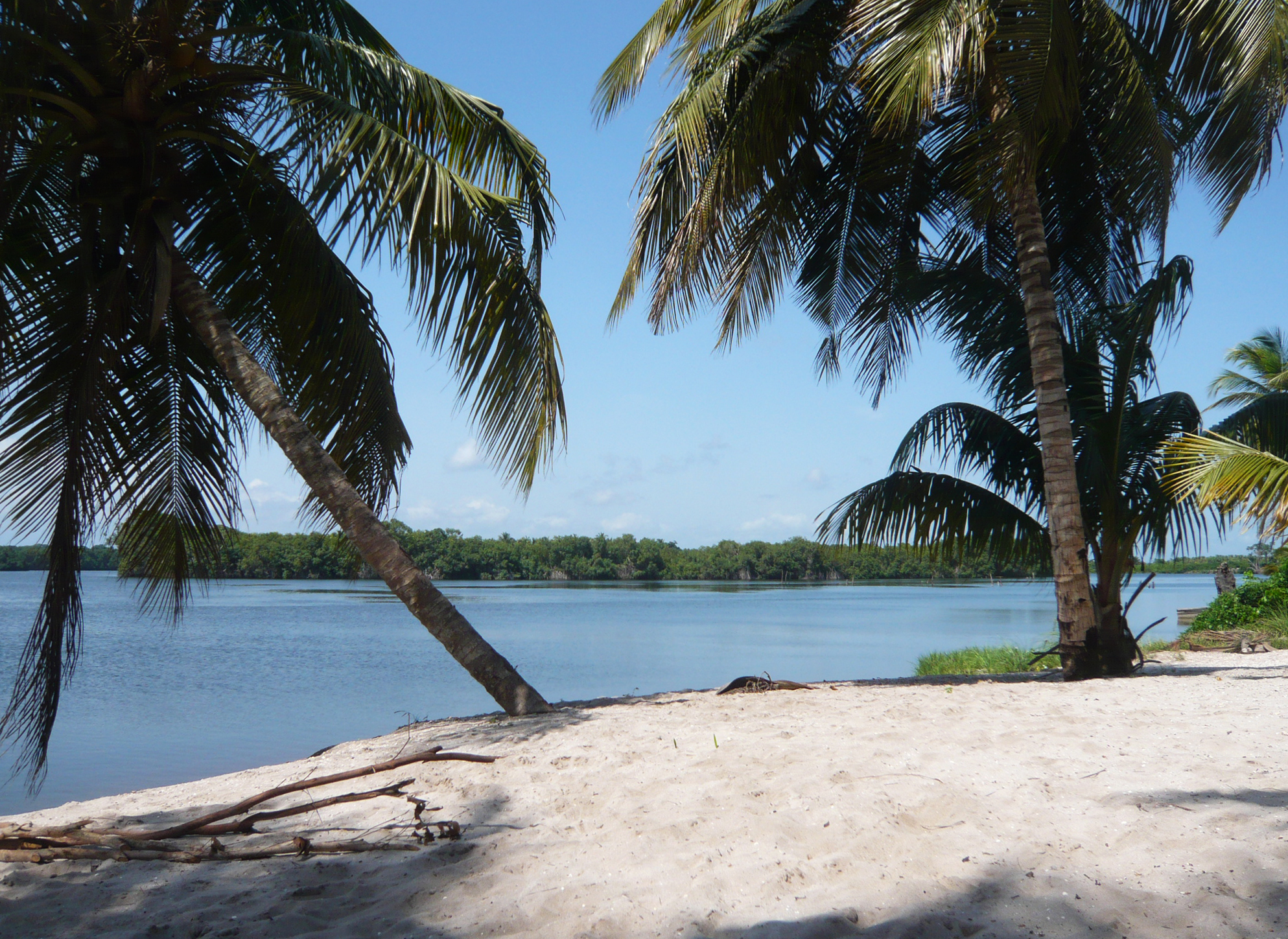

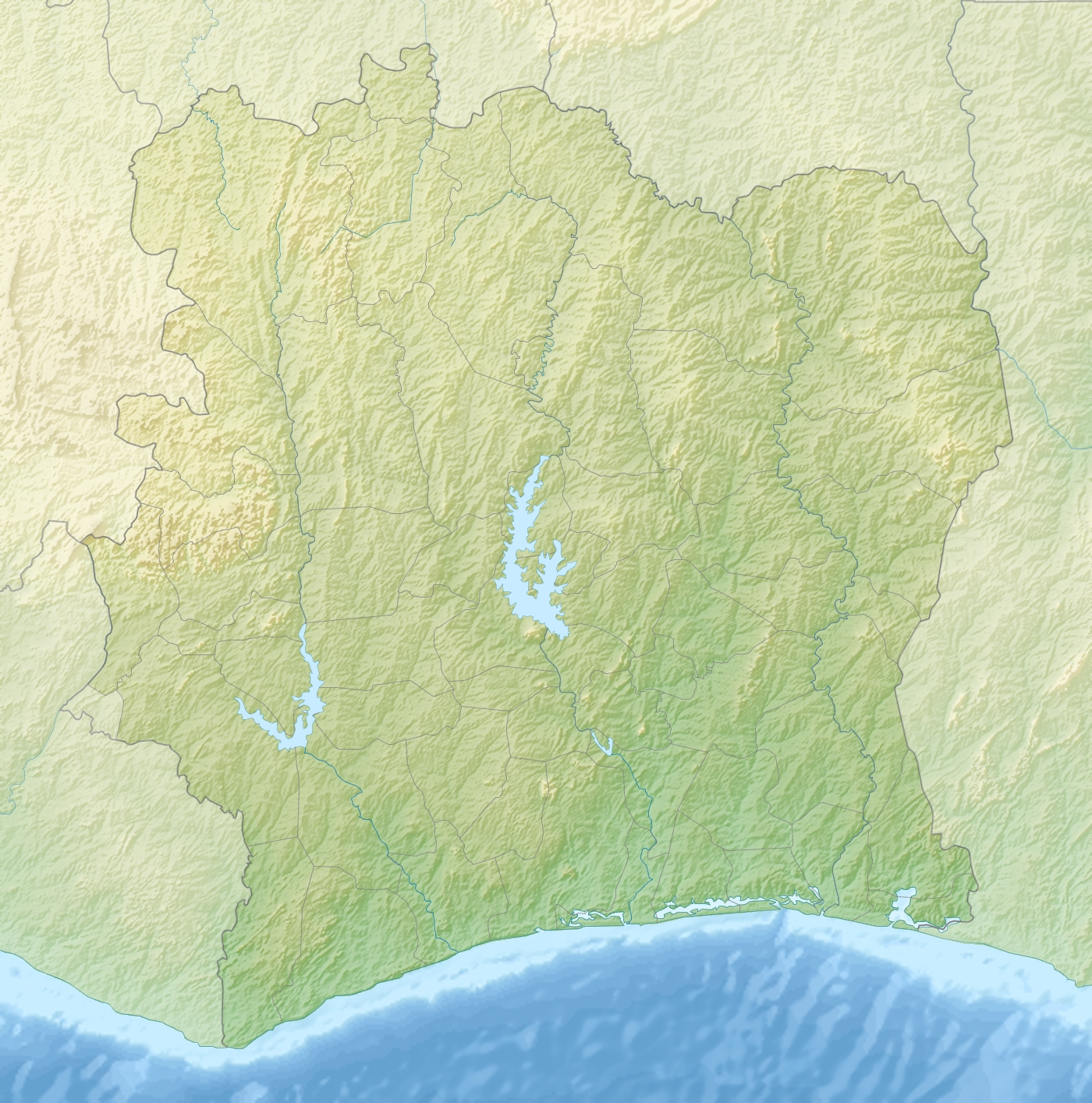
- Location within Ivory Coast
- Interactive map of Îles Ehotilé National Park
- Location: Ivory Coast
- Coordinates: 5°11′N 3°14′W
- Area: 105 km^{2} (41 sq mi)
- Established: 25 April 1974

Ramsar Wetland
- Official name: Iles Ehotilé-Essouman
- Designated: 18 October 2005
- Reference no.: 1584

Îles Ehotilé National Park is a national park of the Ivory Coast in the Sud-Comoé region. The park consists of a group of low islands and the intervening channels that separate Aby Lagoon from the Atlantic Ocean.

The national park was established in 1974 on the initiative of the local communities who wished to protect their historical sites. The Ehotile Islands were designated a Ramsar site in 2005 under the name Îles Ehotilé-Essouman, and a proposal was submitted to UNESCO for consideration of the site as a World Heritage Site in 2006. The archaeological and historical sites on the islands are also protected.

== Physical geography ==
The archipelago consists of six islands (Assokomonobaha, Balouate, Meha, Nyamouan, Elouamin, and the sacred island Bosson Assoun) in the estuarine area. It covers an area of 722 hectares (1,780 acres), not including the surrounding sea area.

== Flora and fauna ==
=== Flora ===
The vegetation of the islands is very varied for such a small area; the coastal zone is mostly dominated by mangroves, and the interior is largely tropical forest with a dense understory.

=== Birds ===
128 species of birds in 35 families have been recorded here. Most of these are aquatic species, and in the dry season migratory species also visit the park. Resident species include the little grebe, African darter, reed cormorant, cattle egret, squacco heron, striated heron, western reef heron, black-crowned night heron, woolly-necked stork, and white-faced whistling duck.

=== Mammals ===
The park is also home to mammals typically inhabiting forest zones, such as duikers and bushpigs, as well as two species that give the park its uniqueness: one of these is the manatee, an aquatic mammal characteristic of the Ivorian lagoons; the other is the colony of straw-coloured fruit bats that roosts on Balouate Island, which the local people believe to be a sign of the presence of their ancestors. Additionally, there are a great variety of other bats, and the islands are home to the spotted-necked otter and the African clawless otter.

== Human activity ==
The population bordering the park is divided between 21 villages and is officially estimated at 32,103 people, or 32% of the total population of the department. Tourism is the only occupation permitted on the islands, and fishing is the main activity outside the protected area.
