= Marahoué National Park =

National park in Ivory Coast

- IUCN category II (national park)
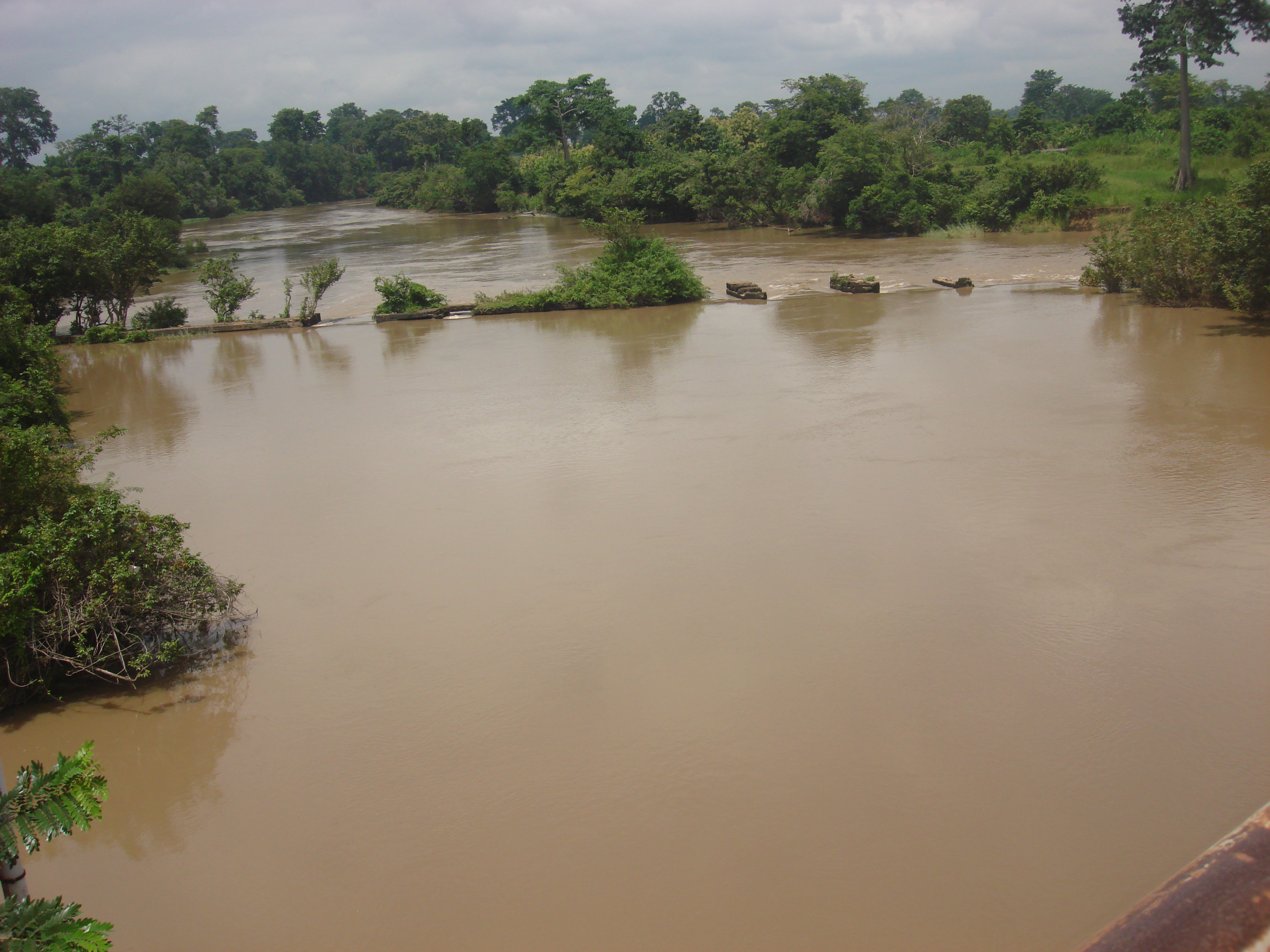
- Marahoué River

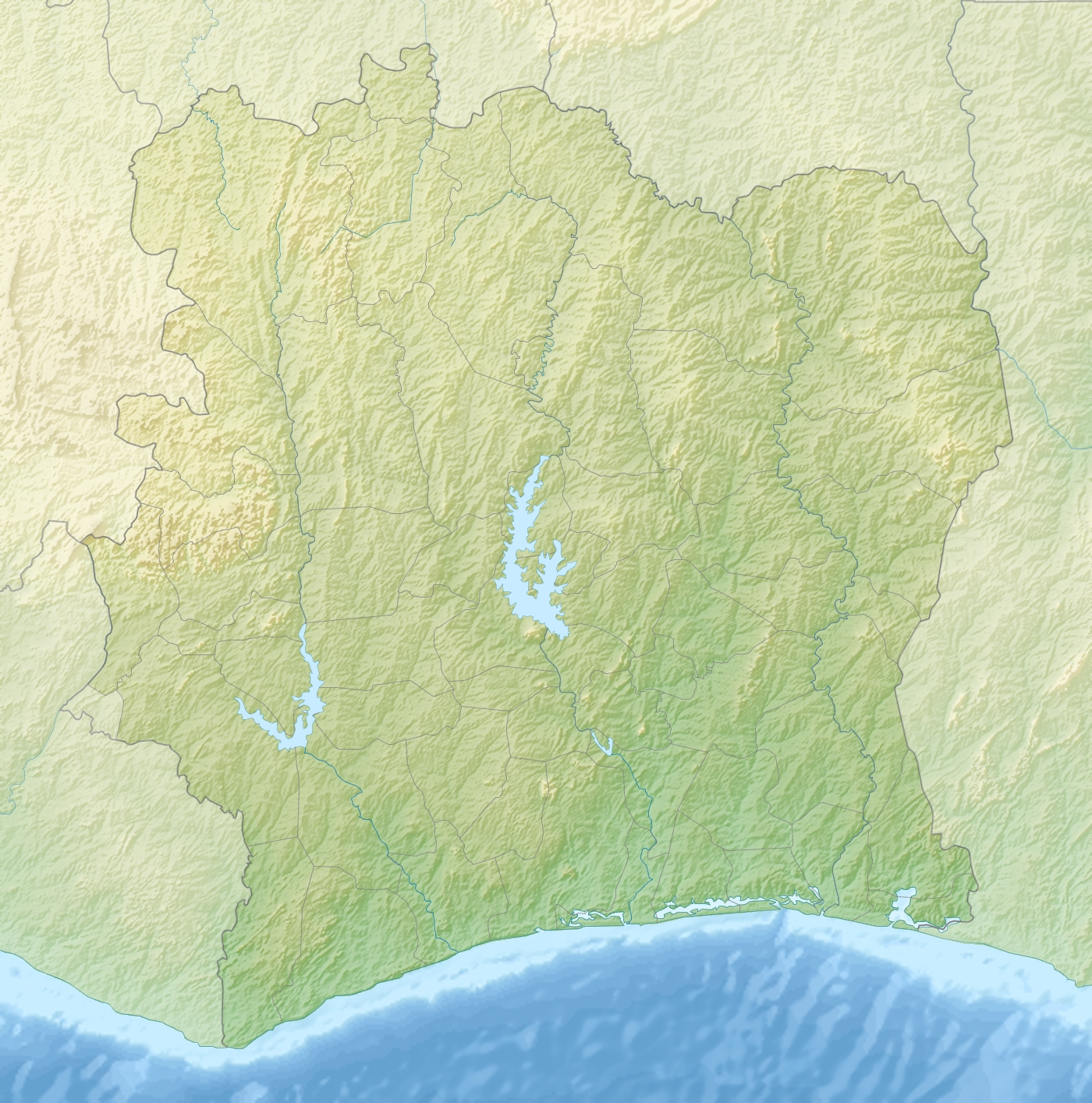
- Location within Ivory Coast
- Location: Côte d'Ivoire
- Coordinates: 7°06′00″N 6°01′30″W
- Area: 1,000 km^{2} (390 sq mi)
- Established: 1968

Marahoué National Park is a national park in Ivory Coast. It was established in 1968, and covers 1,010 km^{2} (390 mi^{2}). However, it has lost nearly all its forest cover in the first two decades of the 21st century. Over the years, the park has been damaged and occupied by people and no longer provides suitable habitat for chimpanzees or many other large animals.

== History ==
The park was established in 1968, having previously been a wildlife reserve, and covers 1,010 km^{2} (390 mi^{2}). It had a great diversity of habitats including 60% dense forest, 15% secondary forest, 5% gallery forest and 17% of savannas interspersed by patches of woodland. By 1975, about 3% of the area had been taken over by cacao plantations and crops. Over the next few decades there has been much illegal logging and settling within the borders of the park, with the conversion of forest into agricultural land. No effective measures were taken to prevent these encroachments. By 2014, the primary forest was entirely gone and only a few remnants of the secondary forest (12%) and gallery forest (4%) remained. Of the remaining area, 15% was agricultural land and plantations, and the remainder was savanna with patches of trees.

== Geography and environment ==
Marahoué National Park is located in Sassandra-Marahoué District in central Ivory Coast, to the west of the town of Bouaflé. Part of the eastern boundary is formed by the Marahoué River, a tributary of the Bandama River. The terrain consists of low hills and intervening valleys. The park is on the boundary between forested areas and wooded savanna and the habitats in the park include gallery forests, forest remnant patches, savannas with scattered trees, and wetlands around pools and watercourses.

=== Flora ===
In the gallery forests and the forest remnants trees such as Triplochiton scleroxylon, Celtis spp., Khaya grandifoliola, Erythrophleum ivorense and Terminalia superba are to be found. In the savanna woodland, Diospyros mespiliformis, Afzelia africana, Lophira lanceolata and Daniellia oliveri are more common.

=== Fauna ===
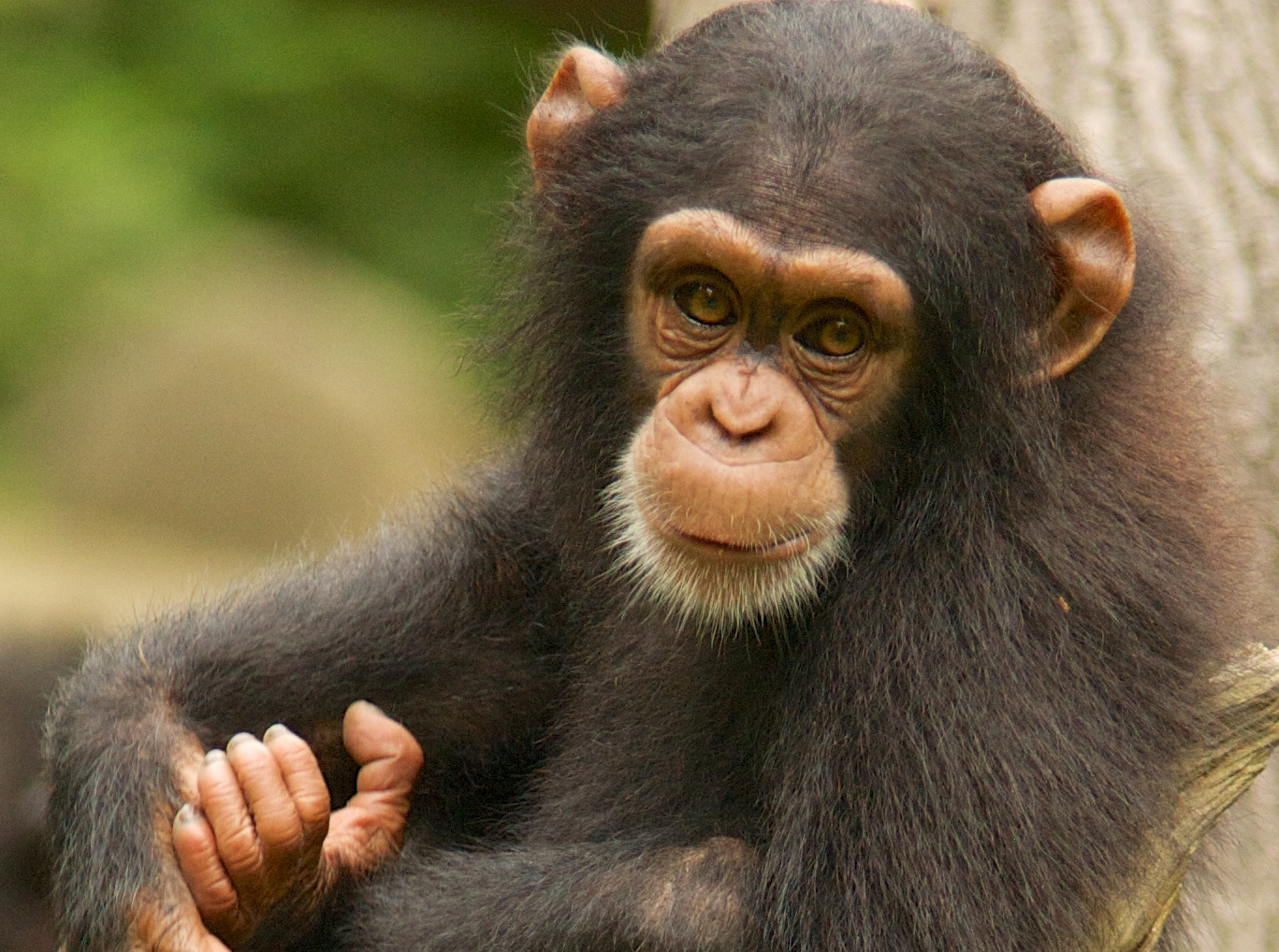
There are no longer any chimpanzees in Marahoué National Park.

This area used to be heavily forested but by 2009, it was reported that 93% of the forest had been lost in the previous six years. With the reduction in forest cover has gone a reduction in forest-dwelling mammals with the numbers of West African chimpanzee being reduced greatly. A 2007 survey indicated that there were fewer than 50 chimpanzees in the park, and by 2018, there were reported to be none. Other mammals recorded in the park are the western red colobus, the African bush elephant, the African buffalo, the bongo, the Maxwell's duiker, the red-flanked duiker, the yellow-backed duiker, the bay duiker, the kob, the waterbuck and the western hartebeest. Wildfires and poaching are serious issues such that the number of antelopes and primates are greatly reduced.

Some 287 species of bird have been recorded in the park, some rarities being the emerald starling, the black-headed bee-eater and the yellow-footed honeyguide. A record for the white-breasted guineafowl awaits confirmation. The park has been designated an Important Bird Area (IBA) by BirdLife International because it supports significant populations of many bird species.
