= Gouiné =

- Town and sub-prefecture
- Location in Ivory Coast
- Coordinates: 7°43′N 7°25′W
- Country: Ivory Coast
- District: Montagnes
- Region: Tonkpi
- Department: Biankouma

Population (2014)
  - Total: 14,909
- Time zone: UTC+0 (GMT)

Gouiné is a town in western Ivory Coast. It is a sub-prefecture of Biankouma Department in Tonkpi Region, Montagnes District.

Gouiné was a commune until March 2012, when it became one of 1,126 communes nationwide that were abolished.

In 2014, the population of the sub-prefecture of Gouiné was 14,909.

== Villages ==
The twenty villages of the sub-prefecture of Gouiné and their population in 2014 are:

1. Béhita (552)
2. Ditomba (266)
3. Douolé (510)
4. Gaolé (716)
5. Gbétondié (680)
6. Gbomba (168)
7. Godigui (446)
8. Gouané (1,337)
9. Gouiné (2,356)
10. Kokialo (1,673)
11. Kpossosso (193)
12. Mamizo (133)
13. Séla (209)
14. Sion (375)
15. Soba (1,898)
16. Sohouba (445)
17. Somba (591)
18. Tompoudié (137)
19. Touoba (1,050)
20. Zagoué - Guiané (1,174)
