= Mont Péko National Park =

National park in Ivory Coast

- IUCN category II (national park)
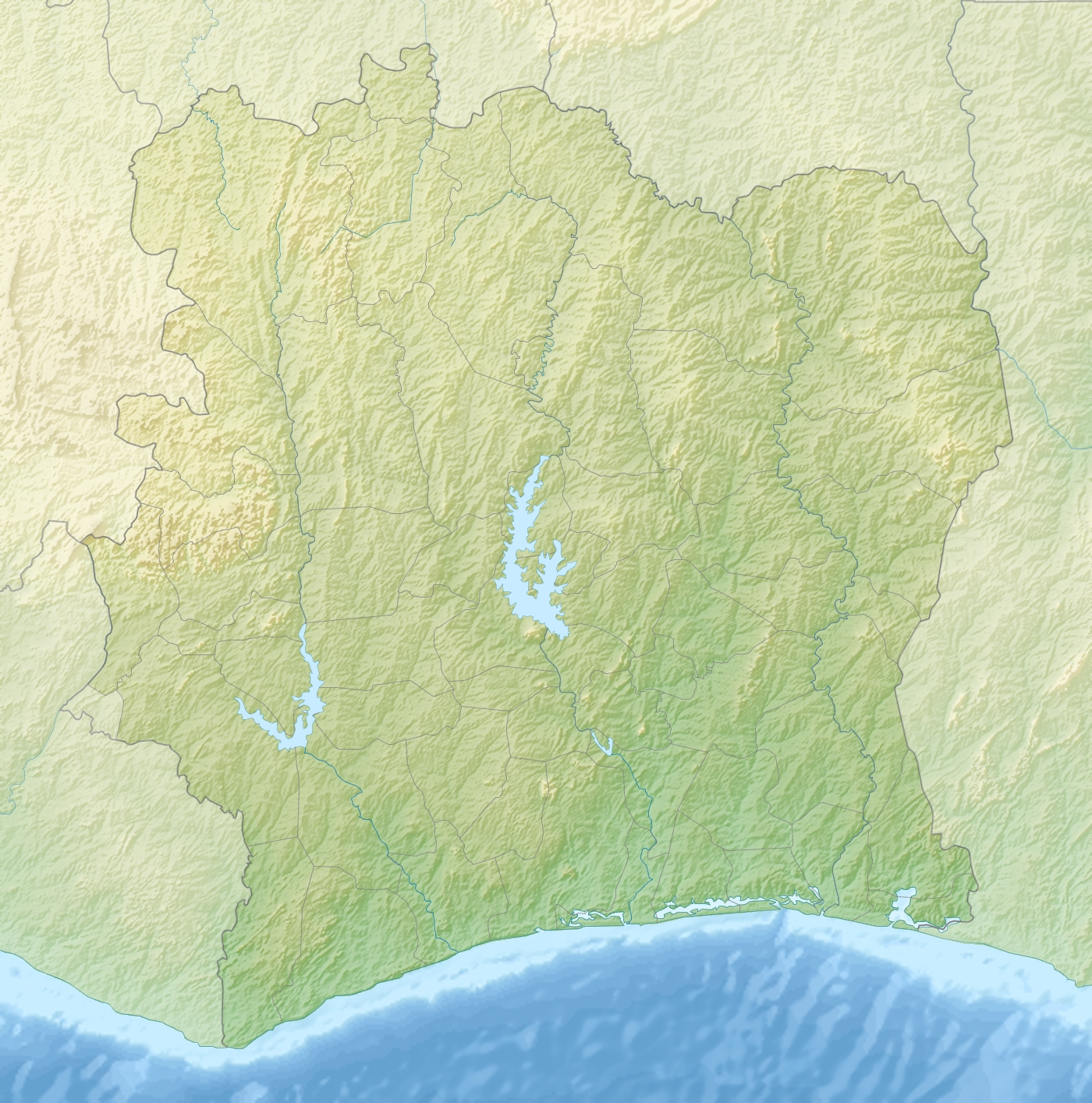
- Location within Ivory Coast
- Location: Côte d'Ivoire
- Coordinates: 7°1′30″N 7°14′20″W
- Area: 340 km^{2} (130 sq mi)
- Established: 1968

Mont Péko National Park is a national park in Ivory Coast. It was established in 1968.

== Geography ==
There are two mountains in Mont Peco National Park. The highest and most prominent is Mont Péko at 997 m.

=== Environment ===
Forest covers 80% of the park. The dominant tree species such as Triplochiton scleroxylon, Celtis spp., Pterygota macrocarpa, and Mansonia altissima. With about 240 species of birds recorded, the park has been designated an Important Bird Area (IBA) by BirdLife International because it supports significant populations of many bird species.

==== Status of Great Apes ====
A recent census carried out by Herbinger and Lia (unpublished reports 2001) found a significant population of chimpanzees in this park. The census was carried out in April 2001 using four different straight transect lines between 2–4 km long and totalling 12.5 km in length. The census suggested a density of 1.6 chimpanzees per km2 and a total population of around 320 weaned chimpanzees for Mont Péko National Park. The classified forest of Haut Sassandra, which is connected through corridors to Mont Péko might still hold up to 400 chimpanzees (Hoppe-Dominik 1991).
