= Mont Sângbé National Park =

National Park, Ivory Coast

Coordinates: 7.9833°N 7.2500°W

- IUCN category II (national park)
- Location: Côte d'Ivoire
- Area: 950 km^{2} (370 sq mi)
- Established: 1976

Mont Sângbé National Park (also spelled Mount Sangbé National Park, Sangbe Mountain National Park) is a national park in Ivory Coast. The Encyclopædia Britannica lists it among the "principal national parks of the world". It acquired national park status in 1976.

== Geography ==
The National Park is located within the Monts du Toura, a range of mountains west of the Sassandra River. It covers an area of 95,000 ha (950 km^{2}/360 sq m) north of Man, between Biankouma and Touba. It occupies a rugged terrain in the eastern end of the highland chain extending through Guinea and northern Liberia. There are many granitic inselbergs and peaks that reach over 700 m (2,300 ft) above sea level. Annual rainfall averages 1,350 mm (53 in).

=== Flora and fauna ===
The park's vegetation is mostly dense savanna woodland, with some small patches of deciduous forest, either as forest islands or as gallery forest. Two types of savanna are found in the southern part of the park. On well-drained soils grasses Brachiaria serrata and Andropogon macrophyllus dominate together with the principal tree species Daniellia oliveri and Lophira lanceloata. On seasonally waterlogged soils there are few woody species and the grass Loudetia phragmitoides predominates. The northern parts are drier and support Sudanian woodland where the tree Isoberlinia doka is abundant.

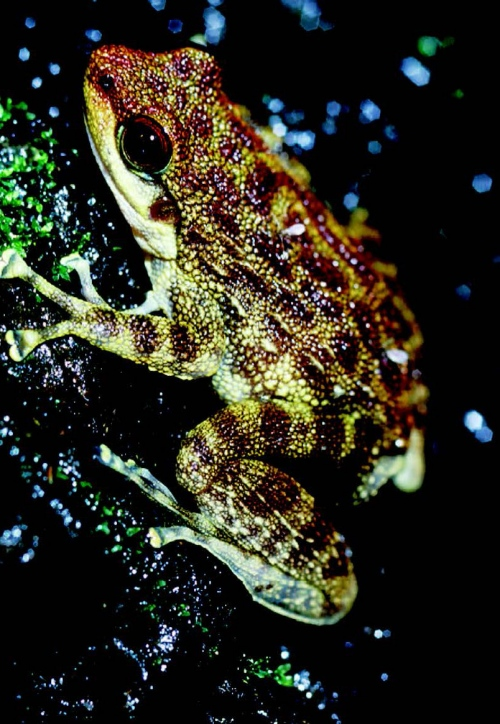
Arndt's torrent-frog Odontobatrachus arndti from Mont Sangbé

Mammal species of conservation concern include western chimpanzee, king colobus, sooty mangabey, Diana monkey, Ebian's palm squirrel, African linsang, African bush elephant, water chevrotain, African buffalo, bongo, Maxwell's duiker, red-flanked duiker, black duiker, yellow-backed duiker, bay duiker, royal antelope, oribi, bohor reedbuck, kob, waterbuck, western hartebeest and roan antelope.

There are two crocodiles of conservation concern: slender-snouted crocodile and dwarf crocodile. The bird fauna is incompletely surveyed but includes species such as Baumann's olive greenbul and emerald starling. The park has been designated an Important Bird Area (IBA) by BirdLife International because it supports significant populations of many bird species.

==== Great apes ====
Herbinger and Lia (unpublished, 2001) carried out a western chimpanzee survey in Mont Sangbe National Park in May 2001, finding a population of 235–260 individuals in a survey area covering less than 5% of the park's total area, a population density of 5.7 chimpanzees per km².

== See also ==
- National park
- Monts du Toura
- Sassandra River
