= Banco National Park =

National park in Côte d'Ivoire

- Banco National Park
- IUCN category II (national park)
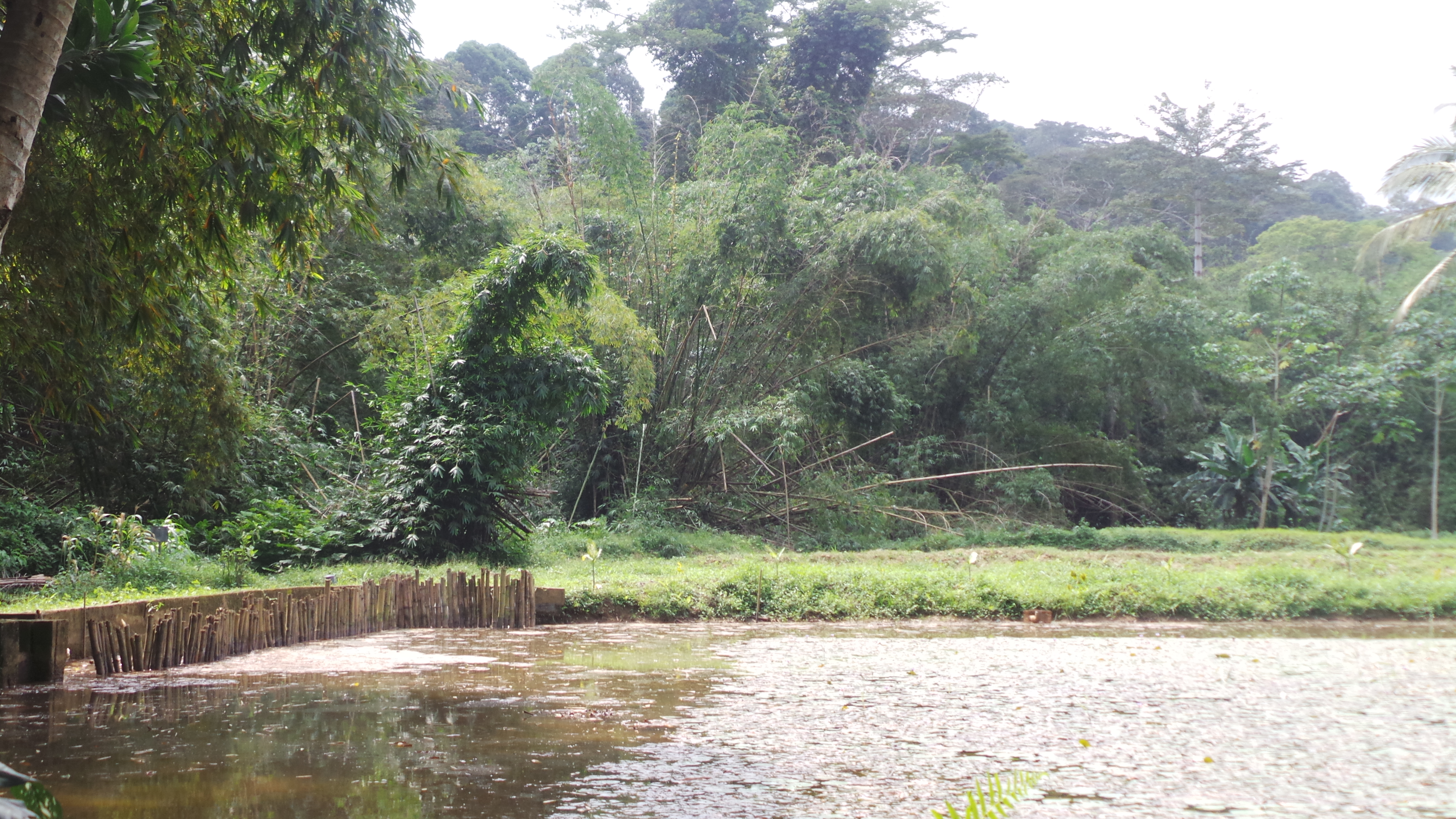
- Banco forest seen from a fish farm

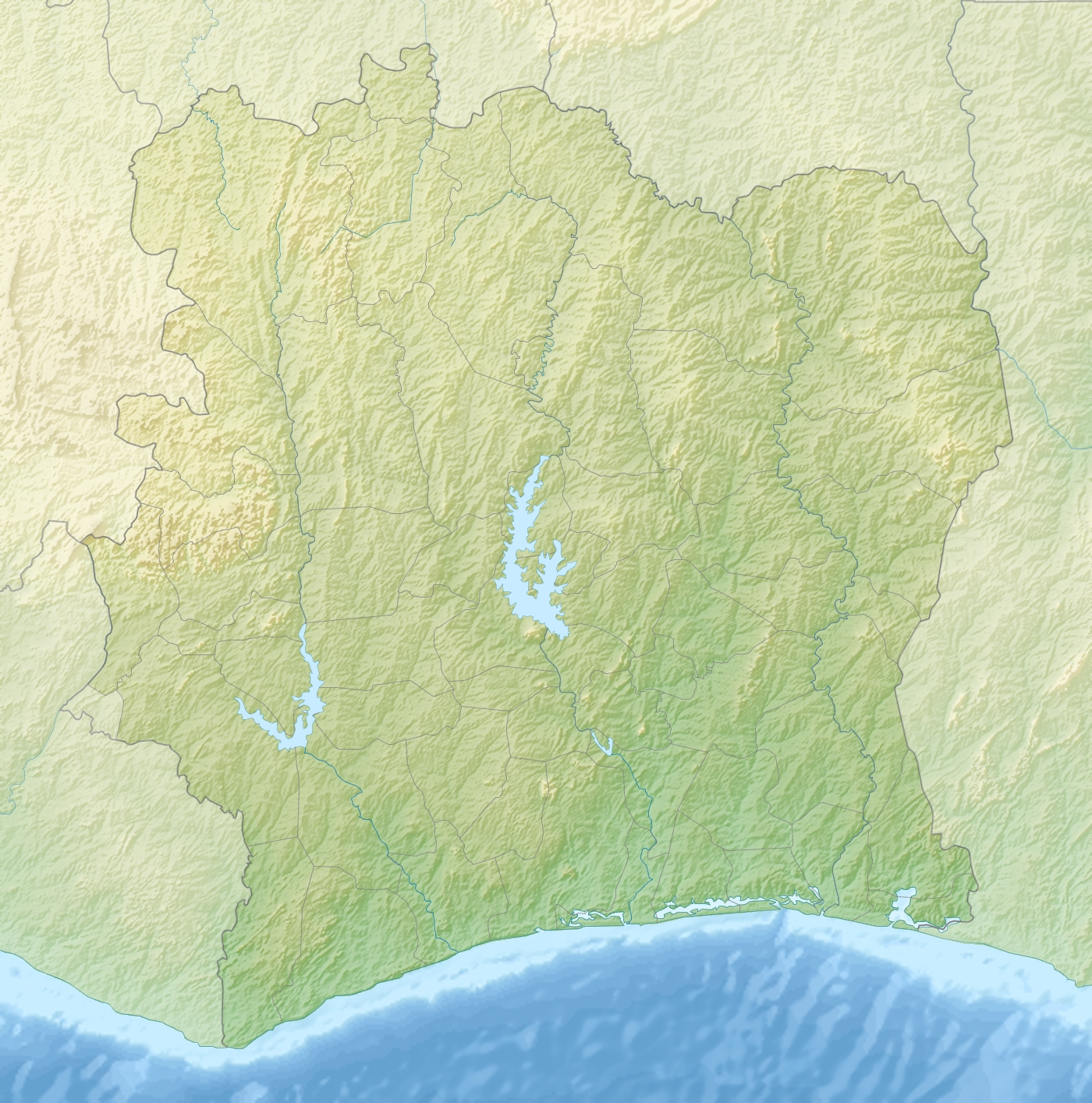
- Location within Ivory Coast
- Interactive map of Banco National Park
- Nearest city: Abidjan,
- Coordinates: 5°23′N 4°3′W
- Area: 30 km^{2} (12 sq mi)
- Designation: National park
- Created: 1953

Banco National Park is a national park in Ivory Coast, located along Highway North in the district of Attécoubé (Abidjan). It is one of the only dense, primary tropical forests located in the heart of an urban area, other than the Tijuca National Park in Rio de Janeiro in Brazil.

It has an area of 34.74 square kilometres (13.41 sq mi).

== History ==
The national parks and nature reserves in Ivory Coast were created to preserve and conserve forest resources in their natural state. In 1926, the Banco forest was given the status of a forest station.

The Banco forest station became the Banco National Park in 1953. Then, in 1966, the Park acquired the status of Permanent Forest Estate of the State under Law 66-433 (passed September 15, 1966) and a decree on the regulation, status, and classification of natural reserves and national parks.

To build electricity infrastructure in the city of Abidjan, a corridor for high-voltage lines opened in the northeastern part of the park at the request of the national electricity company in 1978. This notch is 1.7 km long and 0.15 km wide, creating the outline of a horn. Over time, this horn was called the Triangle de Sagbé, because of its proximity to the Abobo-Sagbé district, located to the north.

== Description ==
The Banco National Park is located in central Abidjan, at the junction of the communes of Abobo, Yopougon, Adjamé, and Attécoubé. Its perimeter forms a square of 7.8 km on each side, and the park covers an area of 3,473.55 hectares (8,583.3 acres) with a boundary line measuring 25.58 kilometres (15.89 mi). The park extends over the former customary domain of the Atié villages of Andokoi and Ebrié, of Anonkoua-Kouté and Agba respectively.

The Banco National Park is the second largest urban park in the world, with the largest being Rio de Janeiro.

The park has a hydraulic reservoir and a primary forest of 600 hectares, with rare types of tree (like mahogany and avodire). The hydraulic reservoir it essential for the city of Abidjan, and feeds 29 boreholes from its water table. The reservoir captures 90,000 tons of carbon dioxide every year and provides 40% of the drinking water distributed in Abidjan.

In the middle of the park flows a river called Gbangbo which means "refreshing water source" in Ebrié.

There are hiking trails and 80 km of bike paths.

== Wildlife ==
Initially, the Banco National Park was notable for its great biodiversity, with native species including the harnessed guib (a type of antelope), duikers (another species of antelope), various primates, suids (hylochere, bushpig) and a large number of bird species. Today, the harnessed guib, a few species of monkeys, and certain bird species remain, some of which are threatened with extinction.

According to a study done in 2004 and 2005, a dozen chimpanzees are believed to still live in the park.

== Security ==
The Banco National Park is currently threatened by illegal logging and poaching, uncontrolled urbanization, and residents dumping their waste in the woods, according to officials. To protect the park, the construction of a 10 km long wall was launched in 2022.

The wall was created to shield against the advance of the urbanization. This curtain of bricks stands 2.5 meters high and more than 8 kilometers long. It is intended to entirely circle the park when finished. It will be completed in two stages: a first portion of 4,400 meters, and a second portion of 4,500 meters.

Maintenance of the park costs 200 million CFA francs per year (305,000 euros).

== Legal status ==
Article 1 of Law 2002-102 of February 11, 2002, on the creation, management and financing of national parks and nature reserves in Ivory Coast, states that a "national park" is an area:

- Under the control of the state, the boundaries of which may not be changed, nor any part of which may be alienated, except by the appropriate legislative authority; and
- exclusively for the propagation, protection, conservation and management of vegetation and wildlife populations, and for the protection of sites, landscapes or geological formations of special scientific or aesthetic value, in the interest and for the recreation of the public.

The status and management procedures for parks and reserves are set out in this law. The penalties incurred by persons who violate the law on the conservation of protected areas are further defined in Articles 70 to 75.

== Gallery ==
Banco National Park

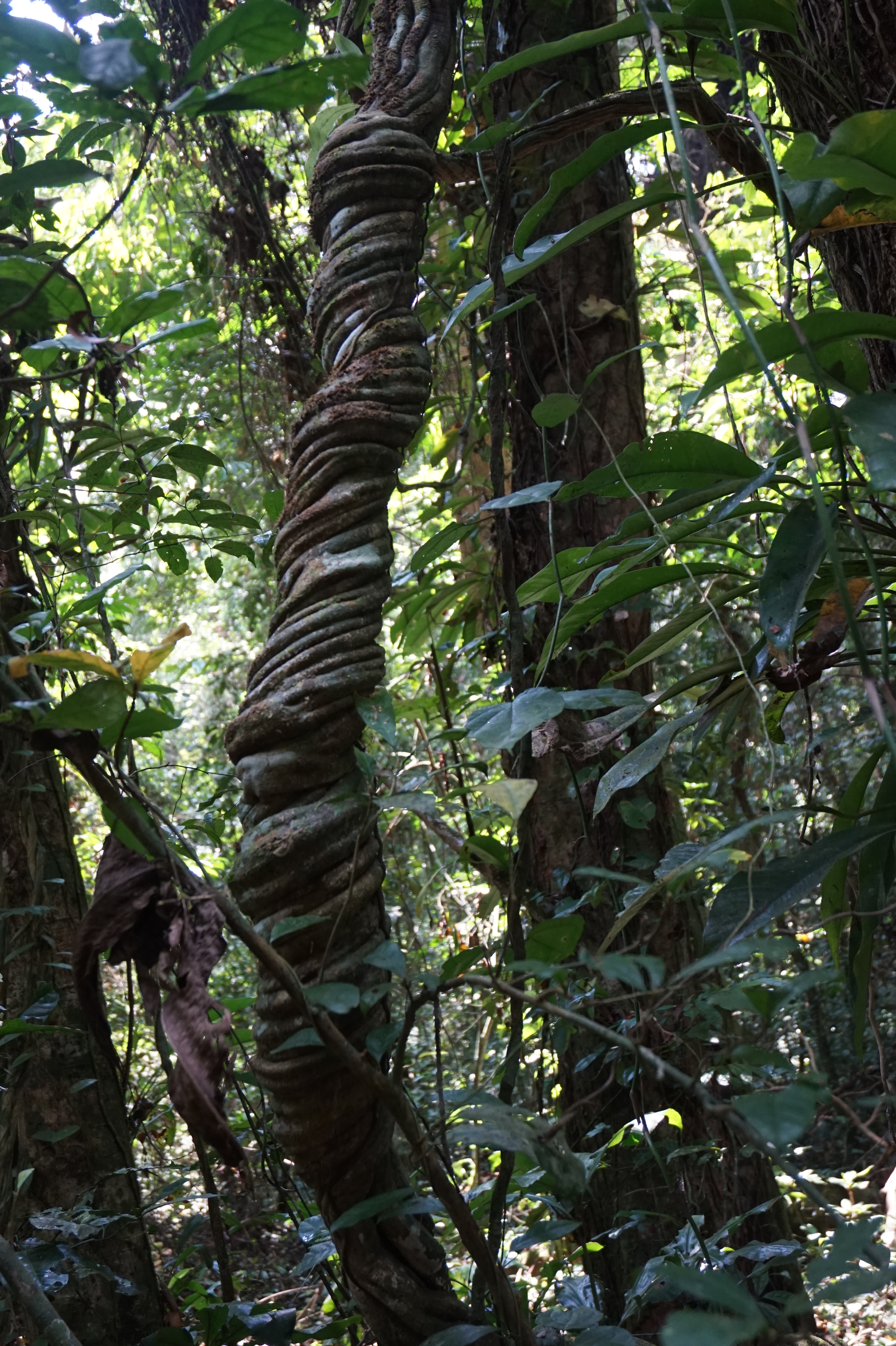
Twisted tree - Banco Forest

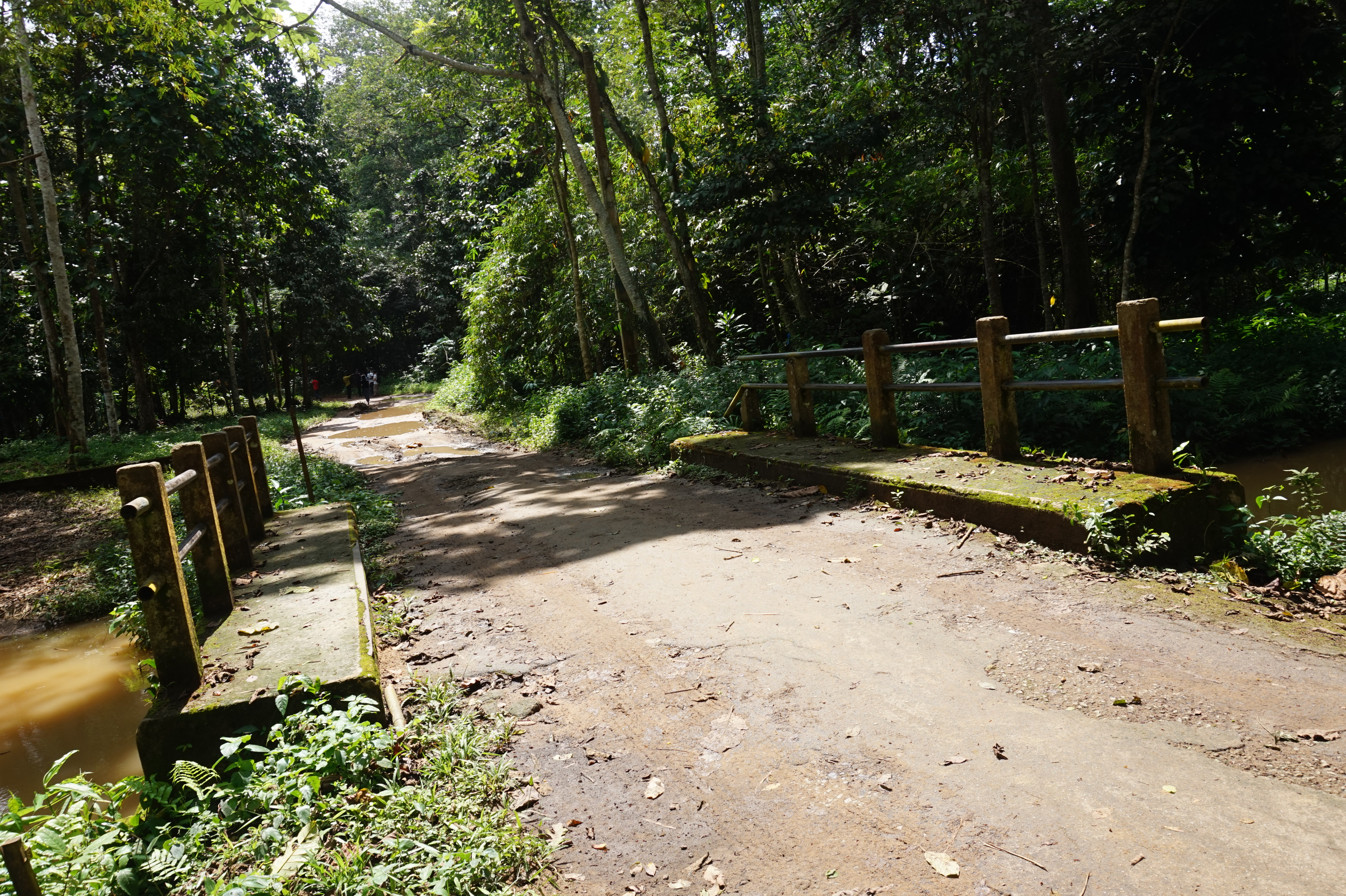
Bridge - Banco Forest

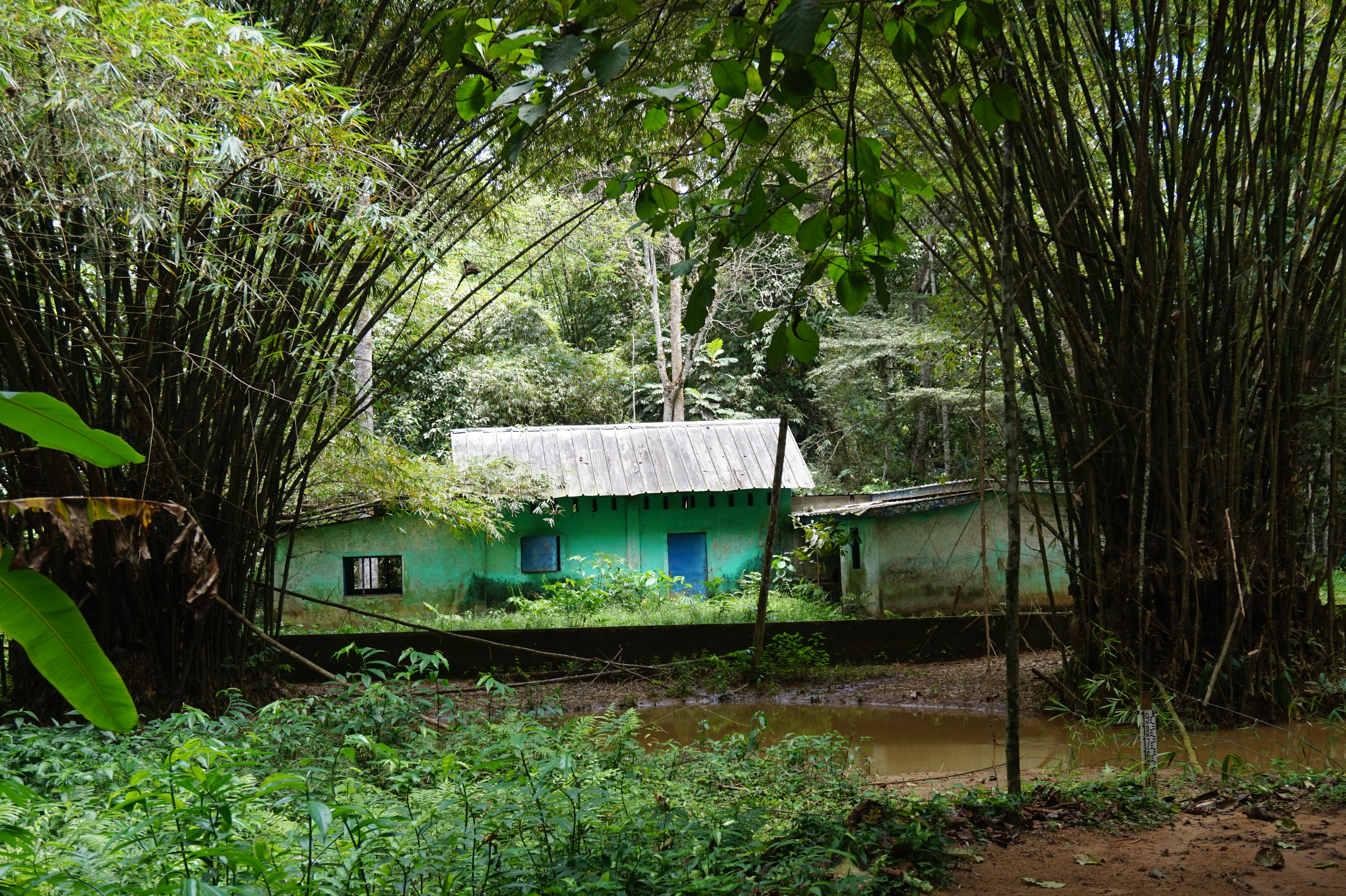
Green house - Banco Forest

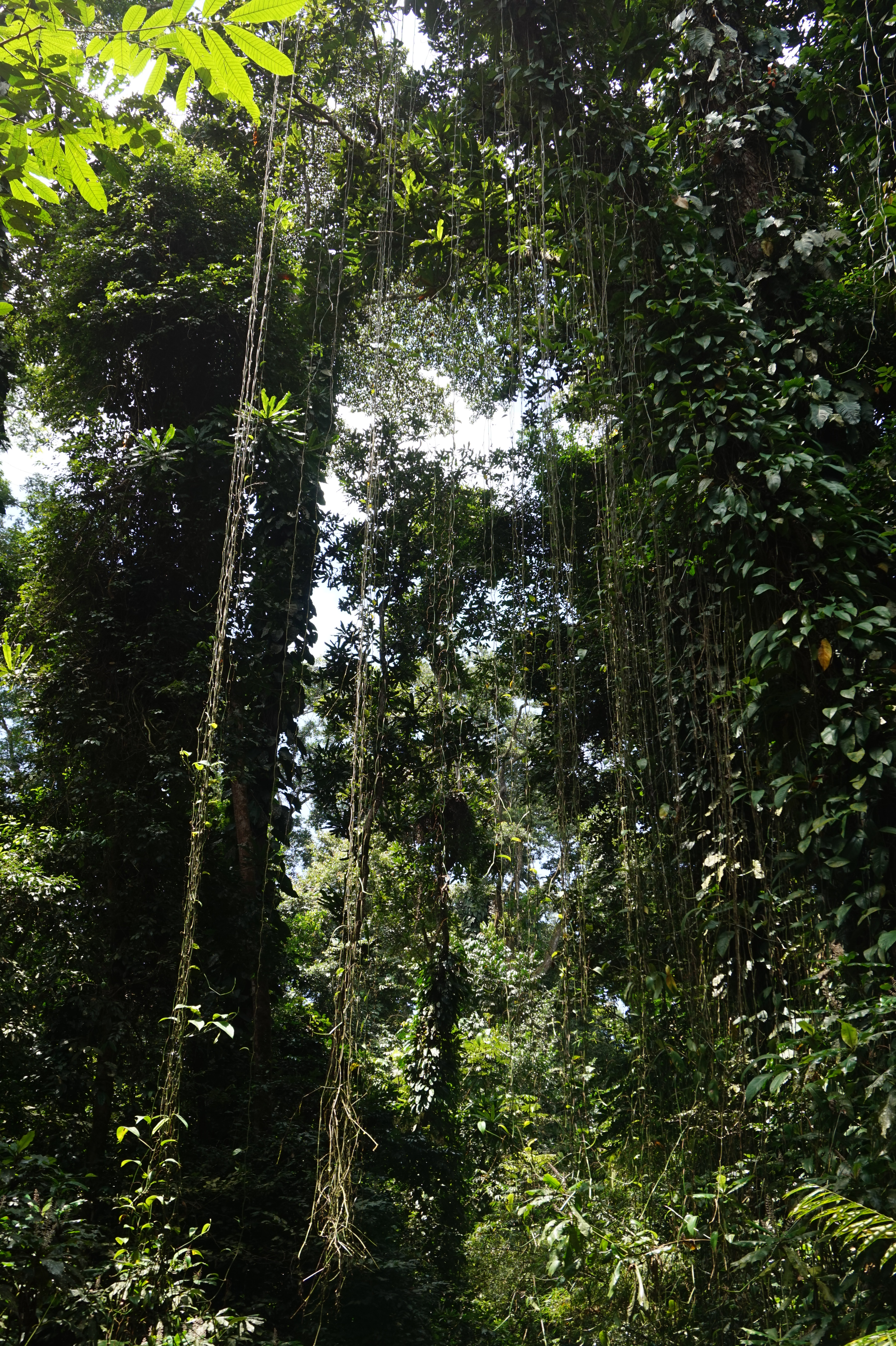
Natural curtain - Banco Forest

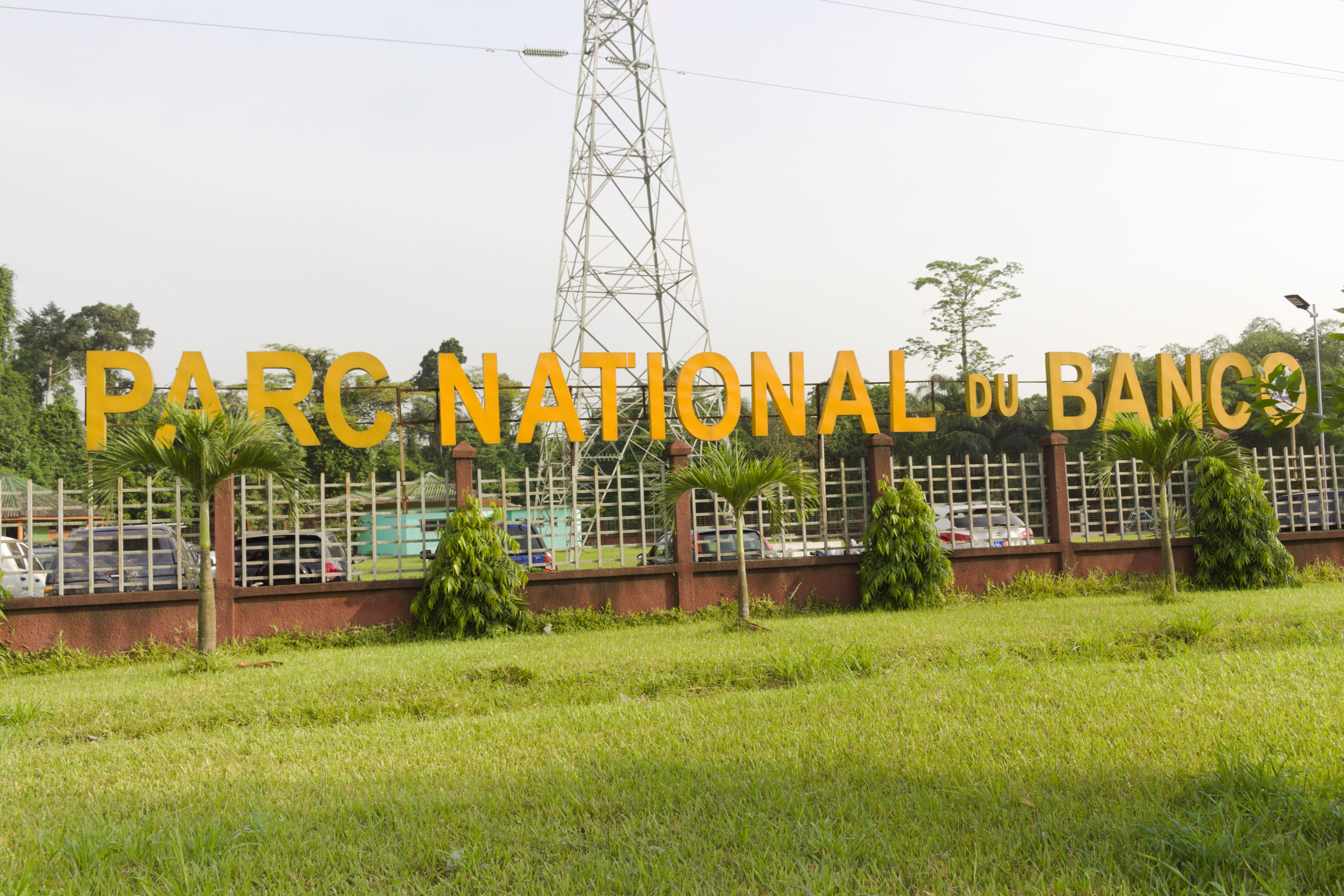
Forestry school of the Banco National Park
