= Biankouma =

- Town, sub-prefecture, and commune
- Location in Ivory Coast
- Coordinates: 7°44′N 7°37′W
- Country: Ivory Coast
- District: Montagnes
- Region: Tonkpi
- Department: Biankouma

Area
  - Total: 653 km^{2} (252 sq mi)

Population (2021 census)
  - Total: 71,470
  - Density: 109/km^{2} (283/sq mi)
  - Town: 17,922
- (2014 census)
- Time zone: UTC+0 (GMT)

Biankouma is a town in western Ivory Coast. It is a sub-prefecture of and seat of Biankouma Department in Tonkpi Region, Montagnes District. Biankouma is also a commune.

The town is divided into old and new towns, the old town buildings being heavily ornamented. Biankouma is also known for its fetish houses and Goua dances. Mont Sângbé National Park lies near the town.

In 2021, the population of the sub-prefecture of Biankouma was 71,470.

== Villages ==
The twenty seven villages of the sub-prefecture of Biankouma and their population in 2014 are:

1. Biankouma (17 922)
2. Biétondié (89)
3. Dingouin (2 029)
4. Dio (1 705)
5. Fondépleu (92)
6. Gan 1 (2 052)
7. Gan 2 (1 932)
8. Gogouin (745)
9. Gouéssésso (838)
10. Guéfinso (297)
11. Kabakouman (2 830)
12. Léma (846)
13. Thé (752)
14. Blagouin (1 760)
15. Doué (1 613)
16. Gbablasso (3 263)
17. Gbonbélo 1 (3 143)
18. Gbonbélo 2 (185)
19. Kanta (624)
20. Mangouin (2 312)
21. Sokourala (265)
22. Kandopleu (1 533)
23. Yégolé (941)
24. Yrougouin (916)
25. Zouzousso 1 (900)
26. Zouzousso 2 (417)
27. Zouangouin (268)

== Gallery ==
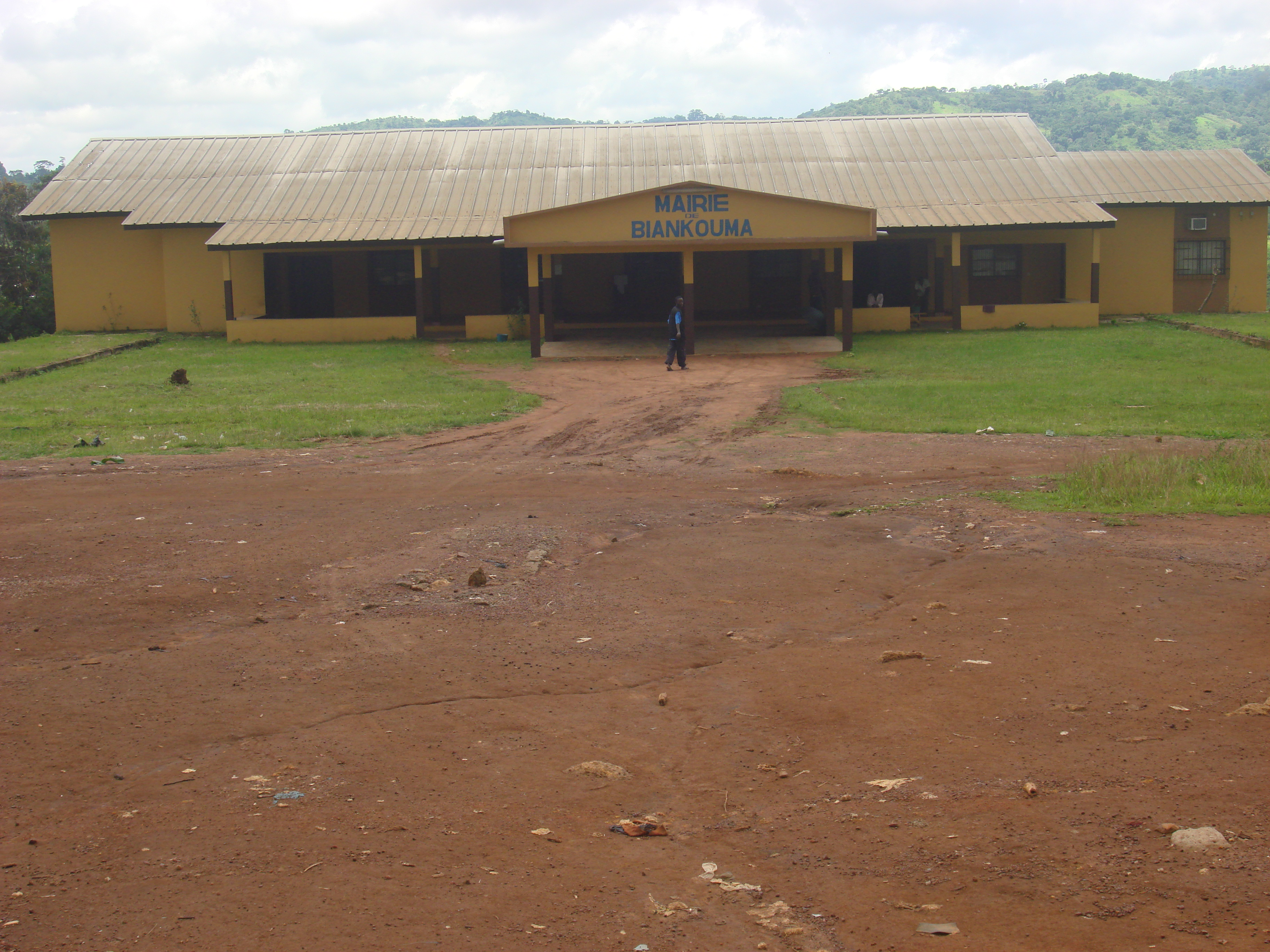
