= Zoupleu =

- Village
- Location in Ivory Coast
- Coordinates: 7°39′N 8°4′W
- Country: Ivory Coast
- District: Montagnes
- Region: Tonkpi
- Department: Danané
- Sub-prefecture: Daleu
- Time zone: UTC+0 (GMT)

Zoupleu is a village in the far west of Ivory Coast. It is in the sub-prefecture of Daleu, Danané Department, Tonkpi Region, Montagnes District.

Zoupleu was a commune until March 2012, when it became one of 1,126 communes nationwide that were abolished.
