= Kpanpleu =

- Village
- Location in Ivory Coast
- Coordinates: 7°6′N 8°14′W
- Country: Ivory Coast
- District: Montagnes
- Region: Tonkpi
- Department: Danané
- Sub-prefecture: Séileu
- Time zone: UTC+0 (GMT)

Kpanpleu is a village in the far west of Ivory Coast. It is in the sub-prefecture of Séileu, Danané Department, Tonkpi Region, Montagnes District.

Until 2012, Kpanpleu was in the commune of Kpanpleu-Sin-Houyé. In March 2012, Kpanpleu-Sin-Houyé became one of 1,126 communes nationwide that were abolished.
