= Gopoupleu =

- Village
- Location in Ivory Coast
- Coordinates: 7°26′N 8°17′W
- Country: Ivory Coast
- District: Montagnes
- Region: Tonkpi
- Department: Danané
- Sub-prefecture: Kouan-Houlé
- Time zone: UTC+0 (GMT)

Gopoupleu is a village in the far west of Ivory Coast. It is in the sub-prefecture of Kouan-Houlé, Danané Department, Tonkpi Region, Montagnes District.

Gopoupleu was a commune until March 2012, when it became one of 1,126 communes nationwide that were abolished.
