= Gouotro =

- Village
- Location in Ivory Coast
- Coordinates: 7°14′N 8°17′W
- Country: Ivory Coast
- District: Montagnes
- Region: Tonkpi
- Department: Danané
- Sub-prefecture: Danané
- Time zone: UTC+0 (GMT)

Gouotro is a village in the far west of Ivory Coast. It is in the sub-prefecture of Danané, Danané Department, Tonkpi Region, Montagnes District. The village is six kilometres east of the border with Liberia.

Gouotro was a commune until March 2012, when it became one of 1,126 communes nationwide that were abolished.
