= Mahapleu =

Mahapleu Kouépleu
- Town and sub-prefecture
- Location in Ivory Coast
- Coordinates: 7°13′N 7°56′W
- Country: Ivory Coast
- District: Montagnes
- Region: Tonkpi
- Department: Danané

Area
  - Total: 464 km^{2} (179 sq mi)

Population (2021 census)
  - Total: 66,898
  - Density: 144/km^{2} (373/sq mi)
  - Town: 14,921
- (2014 census)
- Time zone: UTC+0 (GMT)

Mahapleu (also known as Kuépleu) is a town in western Ivory Coast. It is a sub-prefecture of Danané Department in Tonkpi Region, Montagnes District.

Mahapleu was a commune until March 2012, when it became one of 1,126 communes nationwide that were abolished.

In 2021, the population of the sub-prefecture of Mahapleu was 66,898.

== Villages ==
The twenty one villages of the sub-prefecture of Mahapleu and their population in 2014 are:

1. Beinleu (3,890)
2. Blapleu (810)
3. Dropleu (1,955)
4. Féapleu (1,736)
5. Flampleu (2,752)
6. Gbéleu (152)
7. Gblèpleu (1,907)
8. Gouézépleu (800)
9. Issonneu (879)
10. Iyaba (989)
11. Kangui (669)
12. Kouyépleu (1,077)
13. Kpangouiné (944)
14. Mahapleu (14,921)
15. Mantongouiné (4,284)
16. Monleu (693)
17. Peuzigui (1,805)
18. Singouiné (2,155)
19. Téapleu-Cavally (841)
20. Toueuleu (762)
21. Zoholeu (347)
