= Gbon-Houyé =

- Town and sub-prefecture
- Location in Ivory Coast
- Coordinates: 7°26′N 8°22′W
- Country: Ivory Coast
- District: Montagnes
- Region: Tonkpi
- Department: Danané

Population (2014)
  - Total: 13,640
- Time zone: UTC+0 (GMT)

Gbon-Houyé is a town in the far west of Ivory Coast. It is a sub-prefecture of Danané Department in Tonkpi Region, Montagnes District.

Gbon-Houyé was a commune until March 2012, when it became one of 1,126 communes nationwide that were abolished.

In 2014, the population of the sub-prefecture of Gbon-Houyé was 13,640.

== Villages ==
The seventeen villages of the sub-prefecture of Gbon-Houyé and their population in 2014 are:

1. Bièpleu (573)
2. Bontro (480)
3. Dannipleu (2,447)
4. Dankouampleu (537)
5. Déhé (508)
6. Doualeu (503)
7. Dropleu 2 (377)
8. Gbantopleu (657)
9. Gbèta (931)
10. Gbon-Houyé (931)
11. Glan-Houyé (1,580)
12. Gninglipleu 2 (203)
13. Guian-Houyé (720)
14. Kanta Yolé (1,108)
15. Kpon-Houyé (788)
16. Touopleu (185)
17. Yéalé (1,112)
