= Séileu =

- Town and sub-prefecture
- Location in Ivory Coast
- Coordinates: 7°6′N 8°10′W
- Country: Ivory Coast
- District: Montagnes
- Region: Tonkpi
- Department: Danané

Population (2014)
  - Total: 19,718
- Time zone: UTC+0 (GMT)

Séileu is a town in the far west of Ivory Coast. It is a sub-prefecture of Danané Department in Tonkpi Region, Montagnes District.

Séileu was a commune until March 2012, when it became one of 1,126 communes nationwide that were abolished.

In 2014, the population of the sub-prefecture of Séileu was 19,718.

== Villages ==
The twenty seven villages of the sub-prefecture of Séileu and their population in 2014 are:

1. Bantéadépleu (586)
2. Banzandépleu (464)
3. Bounta (938)
4. Dopleu (637)
5. Douatouo (396)
6. Fieupleu (391)
7. Gniampleu (2,182)
8. Gueudoloupleu (576)
9. Kanta (1,528)
10. Kongatouo (363)
11. Kpanzègbèpleu (484)
12. Kpéapleu (470)
13. Lieussidropleu (381)
14. Lolleu (971)
15. Messampleu (287)
16. Seileu (2,587)
17. Sohoupleu (1,324)
18. Tonnontouo (316)
19. Tron-Hounien (583)
20. Vipleu (311)
21. Yelleu (311)
22. Yotta (763)
23. Zangbatouo (609)
24. Zanhampleu (264)
25. Zan-Hounien (1,100)
26. Zeuguetouo (543)
27. Ziansieupleu (353)
