= Daleu =

- Town and sub-prefecture
- Location in Ivory Coast
- Coordinates: 7°16′N 8°10′W
- Country: Ivory Coast
- District: Montagnes
- Region: Tonkpi
- Department: Danané

Population (2014)
  - Total: 34,308
- Time zone: UTC+0 (GMT)

Daleu is a town in the far west of Ivory Coast. It is a sub-prefecture of Danané Department in Tonkpi Region, Montagnes District.

Daleu was a commune until March 2012, when it became one of 1,126 communes nationwide that were abolished.

In 2014, the population of the sub-prefecture of Daleu was 34,308.

== Villages ==
The twenty villages of the sub-prefecture of Daleu and their population in 2014 are:

1. Bleupleu (1,121)
2. Daleu (2,427)
3. Dantongouiné (876)
4. Diempleu (2,860)
5. Douangopleu (2,137)
6. Douapleu (1,832)
7. Gbanleu (2,327)
8. Gopleu (730)
9. Goueupouta (1,701)
10. Guizreu (2,208)
11. Kata (2,877)
12. Nimpleu 1 (1,125)
13. Nimpleu 2 (754)
14. Oua (925)
15. Tiapleu (580)
16. Yakégbeupleu (369)
17. Yanguileu (1,431)
18. Yasségouiné (3,468)
19. Zérégouiné (2,640)
20. Zoupleu (1,920)
