= Danané =

City and commune in Montagnes, Ivory Coast

- City, sub-prefecture, and commune
- Location in Ivory Coast
- Coordinates: 7°16′N 8°10′W
- Country: Ivory Coast
- District: Montagnes
- Region: Tonkpi
- Department: Danané

Area
  - Total: 683 km^{2} (264 sq mi)

Population (2021 census)
  - Total: 131,586
  - Density: 193/km^{2} (499/sq mi)
  - City: 60,645
- (2014 census)
- Time zone: UTC+0 (GMT)

Danané is a city in the far west of Ivory Coast. It is a sub-prefecture of and the seat of Danané Department in Tonkpi Region, Montagnes District. Danané is also a commune. The city is 25 kilometres east of the border with Liberia, 30 kilometres south of the border with Guinea, and 45 kilometres southeast of the Guinea–Ivory Coast–Liberia tripoint.

Because Danané is close to the Guinean and Liberian borders, it became a destination for refugees during the Liberian Civil War. By the end of 1999, the town of Danané had overgrown its boundaries and swallowed up a number of small villages around it. Many Liberians who were resettled around the world resided in Danané for a period of time.

In 2021, the population of the sub-prefecture of Danané was 131,586.

== Villages ==
The fifty four villages of the sub-prefecture of Danané and their population in 2014 are:

1. Blizreu (531)
2. Bouagleu (833)
3. Bouleu (1 180)
4. Danané (60 645)
5. Déagbaloupleu (527)
6. Déamangbeupleu (1 091)
7. Diotouo (1 285)
8. Dangouiné (1 866)
9. Dougouéleu (657)
10. Drongouiné (1 736)
11. Ganhiba (1 135)
12. Gloaleu (554)
13. Gopieu (179)
14. Kinneu (1 353)
15. Koyatrogbeupleu (265)
16. Kpakièpleu (667)
17. Sogalé (750)
18. Soueupleu (180)
19. Tieukpolopleu (818)
20. Tintouo (286)
21. Trodélépleu (603)
22. Trouimpleu (1 000)
23. Trozandépleu (491)
24. Yoleu (1 625)
25. Youdépleu (485)
26. Zoleu (1 099)
27. Zoueupleu (449)
28. Béatro (147)
29. Bieupleu 2 (80)
30. Bouimpleu (482)
31. Déahouépleu (1 477)
32. Dietta (972)
33. Dohouapleu (182)
34. Gahapleu (411)
35. Gballeu (1 104)
36. Gbangatouo (195)
37. Gbéadanpleu (259)
38. Gbeunta (2 108)
39. Goleu (722)
40. Gouotro (820)
41. Guiapleu (882)
42. Guin-Houyé (2 434)
43. Kahnapleu (544)
44. Kédéré (341)
45. Kpanguidouopleu (447)
46. Ligbeupleu (233)
47. Mouatouo (603)
48. Ouyaleu (85)
49. Pépleu 2 (924)
50. Saleupleu (769)
51. Salleu (1 404)
52. Sioba (1 394)
53. Trokolimpleu (2 398)
54. Yipleu (965)
