= Kouan-Houlé =

- Town and sub-prefecture
- Location in Ivory Coast
- Coordinates: 7°24′N 8°16′W
- Country: Ivory Coast
- District: Montagnes
- Region: Tonkpi
- Department: Danané

Population (2014)
  - Total: 27,926
- Time zone: UTC+0 (GMT)

Kouan-Houlé is a town in the far west of Ivory Coast. It is a sub-prefecture of Danané Department in Tonkpi Region, Montagnes District.

Kouan-Houlé was a commune until March 2012, when it became one of 1,126 communes nationwide that were abolished.

In 2014, the population of the sub-prefecture of Kouan-Houlé was 27,926.

== Villages ==
The twenty five villages of the sub-prefecture of Kouan-Houlé and their population in 2014 are:

1. Bampleu (893)
2. Bouan-Houyé (1,864)
3. Dohouba (463)
4. Flampleu 2 (1,077)
5. Gbapleu (2,358)
6. Gbata (386)
7. Gopoupleu (1,958)
8. Gouéleu (1,063)
9. Guetta (554)
10. Gueukpopleu (634)
11. Gueupleu (503)
12. Gueutagbeupleu (551)
13. Gueutéagbeupleu (562)
14. Kohiba (1,018)
15. Kouan-Houlé (4,900)
16. Kpanpleu-Sin-Houyé (1,687)
17. Kpoleu (1,431)
18. Lampleu 1 (550)
19. Lampleu 2 (474)
20. Manpleu (390)
21. Natta (653)
22. Oumpleupleu (685)
23. Tieupleu 1 (1,102)
24. Zankagleu (959)
25. Zéalé (650)
