= Danané Department =

Coordinates: 7°16′N 8°10′W

Danané Department Département de Danané
- Department
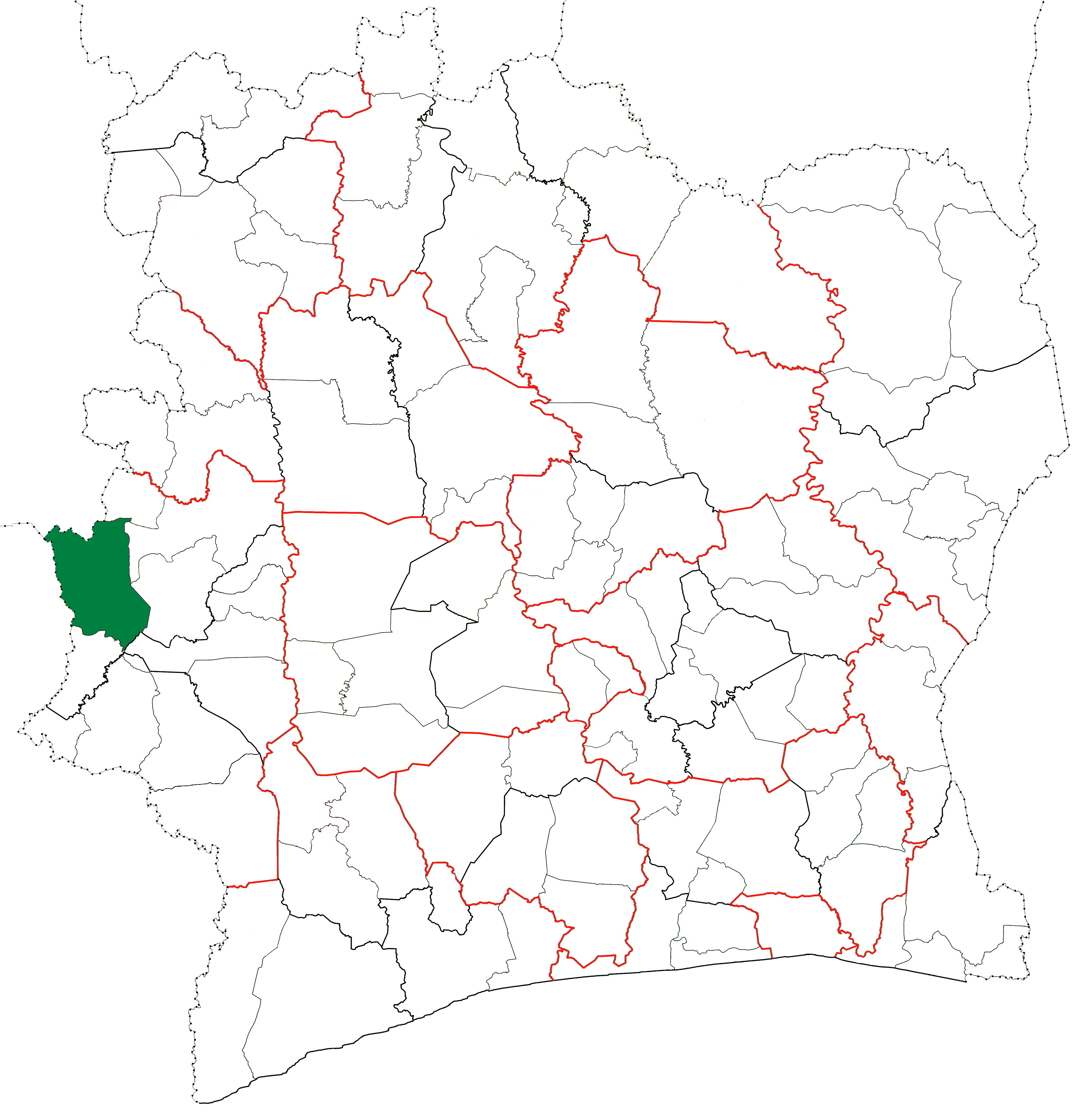
- Location in Ivory Coast. Danané Department has had these boundaries since 2005.
- Country: Ivory Coast
- District: Montagnes
- Region: Tonkpi
- 1969: Established as a first-level subdivision
- 1997: Converted to a second-level subdivision
- 2005: Divided to create Zouan-Hounien Dept
- 2011: Converted to a third-level subdivision
- Departmental seat: Danané

Government
  - Prefect: Sékou Konaté

Area
  - Total: 3,190 km^{2} (1,230 sq mi)

Population (2021)
  - Total: 364,012
  - Density: 114/km^{2} (296/sq mi)
- Time zone: UTC+0 (GMT)

Danané Department is a department of Tonkpi Region in Montagnes District, Ivory Coast. In 2021, its population was 364,012 and its seat is the settlement of Danané. The sub-prefectures of the department are Daleu, Danané, Gbon-Houyé, Kouan-Houlé, Mahapleu, Séileu, and Zonneu.

== History ==
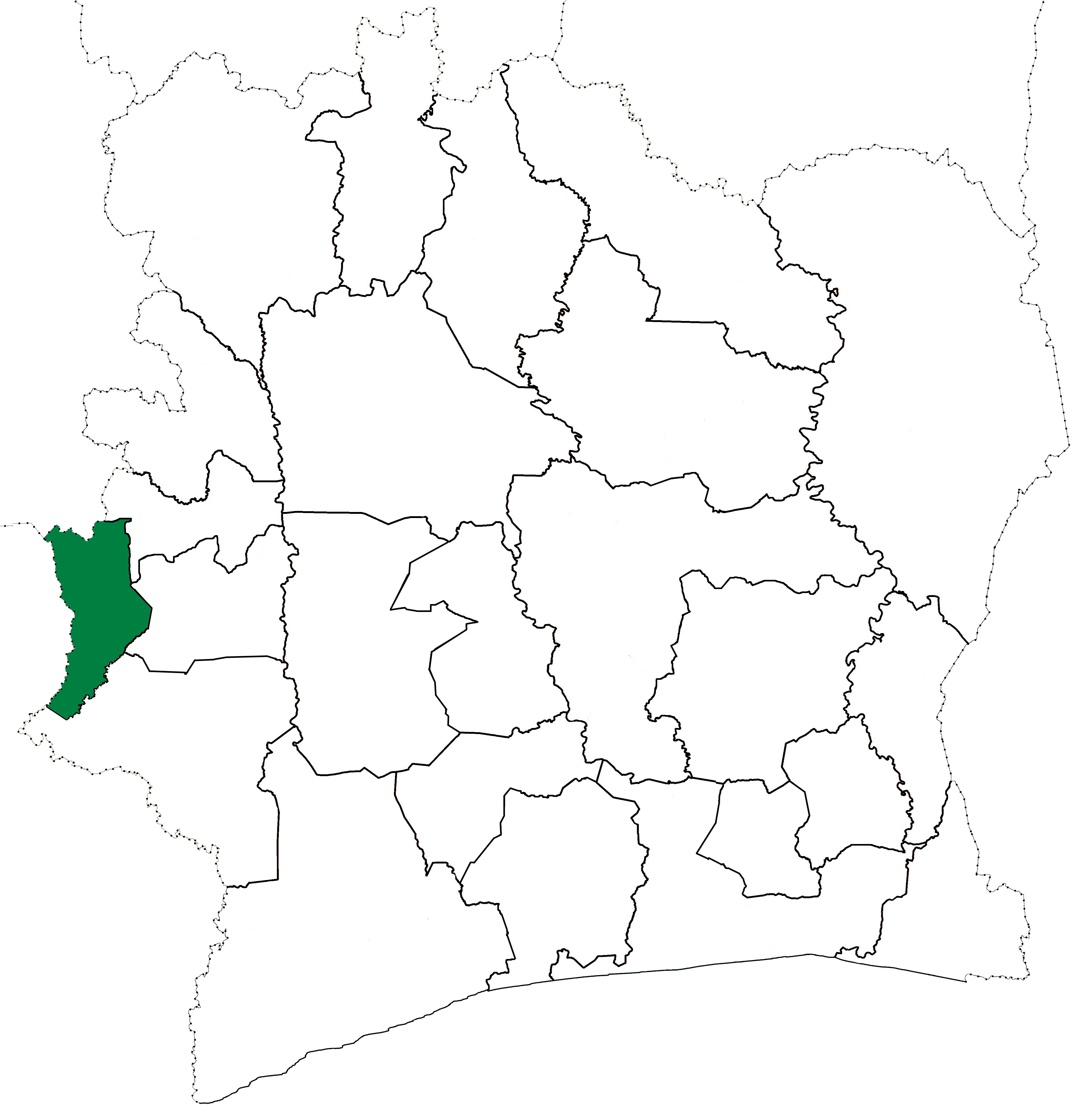
Danané Department upon its creation in 1969. It kept these boundaries until 2005, but other departments began to be divided in 1974.

Danané Department was created in 1969 as one of the 24 new departments that were created to take the place of the six departments that were being abolished. It was created from territory that was formerly part of Ouest Department.

In 1997, regions were introduced as new first-level subdivisions of Ivory Coast; as a result, all departments were converted into second-level subdivisions. Danané Department was included in Dix-Huit Montagnes Region.

The territory of the department was unchanged until 2005, when it was divided in order to create Zouan-Hounien Department.

In 2011, districts were introduced as new first-level subdivisions of Ivory Coast. At the same time, regions were reorganised and became second-level subdivisions and all departments were converted into third-level subdivisions. At this time, Danané Department became part of Tonkpi Region in Montagnes District.
