= Para =

Para, or PARA, may refer to:

== Businesses, professions, and organizations ==
- Paramount Global, traded as PARA on the Nasdaq stock exchange
- Para Group, the former name of CT Corp, an Indonesian conglomerate
- Para Rubber, now Skellerup, a New Zealand manufacturer
- Para USA, formerly Para-Ordnance, a firearms manufacturer
- Pan American Rugby Association
- Philippine Amateur Radio Association
- Paraprofessional, general term encompassing paralegals, paramedics etc.
- Paralegal
- Paramilitary, organisations not part of the armed forces but operate as such
- Paramedic
- Parapsychology, the study of alleged psychic phenomena

== People ==
- Pará (footballer, born 1986), Marcos Rogério Ricci Lopes
- Pará (footballer, born 1987), Erinaldo Rabelo Santos
- Pará (footballer, born 1995), Anderson Ferreira da Silva
- Pará (footballer, born 2002), Luis Felipe Rabelo Costa
- André Cordeiro (water polo) (born 1967), nicknamed Pará, Brazilian water polo player
- Para Draine (born 1972), American female boxer
- Begum Para (1926–2008), Indian film actress

== Places ==
=== India ===
- Para (community development block), Purulia district, West Bengal, India
  - Para, Purulia
  - Para (Vidhan Sabha constituency)
- Para, Jhabua, Madhya Pradesh, India
- Para, Rajasthan, India
- Para, Unnao, Uttar Pradesh, India
- Para, Raebareli, Uttar Pradesh, India

=== Others ===
- Para (Bengali), a Bengali word meaning neighborhood or locality
- Pará, a state of Brazil
- Para, Ivory Coast
- Para District, Suriname
- Para River (disambiguation)
- La Para, a summit in the Swiss Alps

== Science and technology ==
- Parity (biology), the number of times a woman has given birth, e.g. para 1 etc.
- Para, common name of fern Ptisana salicina
- para, symbol for the fruit fly gene paralytic (gene)
- Para- (chemistry), a position of a substituent on a cyclic hydrocarbon
- Para red, a dye

== Special forces ==
- Para Commando Brigade (Bangladesh), special forces of the Bangladeshi Army
- Para (Special Forces), special forces of the Indian Army
- Parachute Regiment (United Kingdom), elite infantry of the British Army, known as The Paras
- Paratrooper, a military parachutist
  - Para Commandos, a paratrooper and commando

== Other uses ==
- Para (currency), a former currency of the Ottoman Empire
- Para language, an unclassified Naga language of India and Burma
- Para Handy, a fictional character in the Glasgow Evening News
- Para Shakti, a Hindu goddess of the Shakti type sometimes concatenated Parashakti
- Brazilian ship Pará, a list of ships
- Juz', or para, a division of the Quran

== See also ==
- Paras (disambiguation)
- Param (disambiguation)
- List of commonly used taxonomic affixes
- Para Para, a popular Japanese solo dance
- Paara (film), a 1985 Indian film
- "Paaraa", a song from the 2024 Indian film Indian 2
- Parachute Regiment (disambiguation)
- Paralympic Games, international games for athletes with a disability
