= Mahino =

- Village
- Location in Ivory Coast
- Coordinates: 5°7′N 7°25′W
- Country: Ivory Coast
- District: Bas-Sassandra
- Region: San-Pédro
- Department: Tabou
- Sub-prefecture: Djouroutou
- Time zone: UTC+0 (GMT)

Mahino is a village in south-western Ivory Coast. It is in the sub-prefecture of Djouroutou, Tabou Department, San-Pédro Region, Bas-Sassandra District. The village is 8 kilometres (5 mi) east of the border with Liberia.

Mahino was a commune until March 2012, when it became one of 1,126 communes nationwide that were abolished.
