= Iboké =

- Village
- Location in Ivory Coast
- Coordinates: 4°41′N 7°24′W
- Country: Ivory Coast
- District: Bas-Sassandra
- Region: San-Pédro
- Department: Touba
- Sub-prefecture: Dapo-Iboké
- Time zone: UTC+0 (GMT)

Iboké is the name of four clustered villages in south-western Ivory Coast. They are in the sub-prefecture of Dapo-Iboké, Tabou Department, San-Pédro Region, Bas-Sassandra District. The villages are called Iboké 1, Iboké 2, Iboké 3, and Iboké 4.

Iboké was a commune until March 2012, when it became one of 1,126 communes nationwide that were abolished.
