= Tabou =

Tabou may refer to:

- Tabou Department

- Tabou, Ivory Coast, town and sub-prefecture, seat of the Tabou Department in the Bas-Sassandra District

- Tabou Airport
- Le Tabou, a jazz club in Paris (France)

== See also ==
- Taboo
- Taboo (disambiguation)
- Tabu
