= Adjaméné =

- Village
- Location in Ivory Coast
- Coordinates: 4°46′N 6°51′W
- Country: Ivory Coast
- District: Bas-Sassandra
- Region: San-Pédro
- Department: San-Pédro
- Sub-prefecture: Grand-Béréby
- Time zone: UTC+0 (GMT)

Adjaméné is a village in south-western Ivory Coast. It is in the sub-prefecture of Grand-Béréby, San-Pédro Department, San-Pédro Region, Bas-Sassandra District.

Adjaméné was a commune until March 2012, when it became one of 1,126 communes nationwide that were abolished.
