= Ménéké =

- Village
- Location in Ivory Coast
- Coordinates: 4°31′N 7°17′W
- Country: Ivory Coast
- District: Bas-Sassandra
- Region: San-Pédro
- Department: Tabou
- Sub-prefecture: Tabou
- Time zone: UTC+0 (GMT)

Ménéké is a village in the far southwest of Ivory Coast. It is in the sub-prefecture of Tabou, Tabou Department, San-Pédro Region, Bas-Sassandra District. The village is five kilometres northwest of the coast.

Ménéké was a commune until March 2012, when it became one of 1,126 communes nationwide that were abolished.
