= Grobonou-Dan =

- Village
- Location in Ivory Coast
- Coordinates: 5°3′N 6°24′W
- Country: Ivory Coast
- District: Bas-Sassandra
- Region: San-Pédro
- Department: San-Pédro
- Sub-prefecture: Gabiadji
- Time zone: UTC+0 (GMT)

Grobonou-Dan is a village in south-western Ivory Coast. It is in the sub-prefecture of Gabiadji, San-Pédro Department, San-Pédro Region, Bas-Sassandra District.

Grobonou-Dan was a commune until March 2012, when it became one of 1,126 communes nationwide that were abolished.
