= Podoué =

Podoué Podwé; Poday
- Village
- Location in Ivory Coast
- Coordinates: 4°49′N 7°33′W
- Country: Ivory Coast
- District: Bas-Sassandra
- Region: San-Pédro
- Department: Tabou
- Sub-prefecture: Grabo
- Time zone: UTC+0 (GMT)

Podoué (also spelled Podwé and Poday) is a village in southwestern Ivory Coast. It is in the sub-prefecture of Grabo, Tabou Department, San-Pédro Region, Bas-Sassandra District. Podoué is 3 kilometres (1.9 mi) east of the Cavally River, which forms the border between Ivory Coast and Liberia.

Podoué was a commune until March 2012, when it was one of 1,126 communes nationwide that were abolished.
