= Touih =

- Village
- Location in Ivory Coast
- Coordinates: 5°16′N 6°32′W
- Country: Ivory Coast
- District: Bas-Sassandra
- Region: San-Pédro
- Department: San-Pédro
- Sub-prefecture: Gabiadji

Population (2014 census)
  - Village: 15,958
- Time zone: UTC+0 (GMT)

Touih is a village in southwestern Ivory Coast. It is in the sub-prefecture of Gabiadji, San-Pédro Department, San-Pédro Region, Bas-Sassandra District.

Touih was a commune until March 2012, when it became one of 1,126 communes nationwide that were abolished.
