= Djapadji =

- Village
- Location in Ivory Coast
- Coordinates: 5.29204°N 6.82054°W
- Country: Ivory Coast
- District: Bas-Sassandra
- Region: San-Pédro
- Department: San-Pédro
- Sub-prefecture: Doba

Population (2014 census)
  - Village: 30,605
- Time zone: UTC+0 (GMT)

Djapadji is a village in south-western Ivory Coast. It is located in the sub-prefecture of Doba, San-Pédro Department, San-Pédro Region, Bas-Sassandra District. The village sits on the outskirts of Taï National Park.

Djapadji was a commune until March 2012, when it became one of 1,126 communes nationwide that were abolished.
