= Gagny, Ivory Coast =

Gagny Gagné
- Village
- Location in Ivory Coast
- Coordinates: 5.05042°N 6.74453°W
- Country: Ivory Coast
- District: Bas-Sassandra
- Region: San-Pédro
- Department: San-Pédro
- Sub-prefecture: Doba
- Time zone: UTC+0 (GMT)

Gagny (also spelled Gagné) is a village in south-western Ivory Coast. It is in the sub-prefecture of Doba, San-Pédro Department, San-Pédro Region, Bas-Sassandra District.

Gagny was a commune until March 2012, when it became one of 1,126 communes nationwide that were abolished.
