= Gligbéuadji =

- Village
- Location in Ivory Coast
- Coordinates: 5°12′N 6°42′W
- Country: Ivory Coast
- District: Bas-Sassandra
- Region: San-Pédro
- Department: San-Pédro
- Sub-prefecture: Doba

Population (2014 census)
  - Village: 24,979
- Time zone: UTC+0 (GMT)

Gligbéuadji is a village in south-western Ivory Coast. It is in the sub-prefecture of Doba, San-Pédro Department, San-Pédro Region, Bas-Sassandra District.

Gligbéuadji was a commune until March 2012, when it was one of 1,126 communes nationwide that were abolished.
