= Franz Baermann Steiner =

Czech-British ethnologist, polymath, essayist, aphorist and poet (1909-1952)

- Steiner in 1938
- Born: 12 October 1909; Karlín, Austria-Hungary
- Died: 27 November 1952 (aged 43); Oxford, England
- Occupations: Anthropologist, poet
- Writing career
- Language: German, Czech
- Genres: Anthropology, Literature
- Notable work: Taboo

Franz Baermann Steiner (12 October 1909 – 27 November 1952) was an ethnologist, polymath, essayist, aphorist, and poet. He was familiar, apart from German, Yiddish, Czech, Greek and Latin, with both classical and modern Arabic, Hebrew, Turkish, Armenian, Persian, Malay, English, French, Spanish, Italian, Russian, six other Slavic languages, Scandinavian languages and Dutch.

He taught at the University of Oxford from 1950 until his death two years later. His most widely known work, Taboo, is composed of his lectures on the subject and was posthumously published in 1956. The extensive influence his thinking exercised on British anthropologists of his generation is only now becoming apparent, with the publication of his collected writings. The Holocaust claimed his parents, in Treblinka in 1942, together with most of his kin.

== Biography ==
His paternal family hailed from Tachov in Western Bohemia and his father was a small retail businessman dealing in cloth and leather goods. His mother's family was from Prague. Neither side practised Judaism, and his father was an atheist, but Franz received elements of a religious education at school, and from occasional attendance at synagogues. He belonged to the last generation of the German, and Jewish, minority in Prague of the last days of the Austro-Hungarian empire, who were to make distinctive contributions to German literature. From his early childhood he was a close friend of Hans Günther Adler and Wolf Salus, the son of Hugo Salus. In 1920 he entered the German State Gymnasium in Štepánská Street, where Max Brod and Franz Werfel had studied. He joined the Roter Studentenbund (Red Student Union) in 1926. He was attracted to Marxism early, a fascination that lasted until 1930, and also to political Zionism. He enrolled at the German University of Prague in late 1928 for coursework on Semitic languages, with a minor in ethnology, while pursuing as an external student courses in Siberian ethnology and Turkish studies at the Czech language Charles University of Prague. He studied Arabic abroad for a year, in 1930–31, at the Hebrew University in Palestine. In Jerusalem, after some time staying with an Arab family, he was forced to move out by the British, and took up digs with the Jewish philosopher Hugo Bergmann, a key figure in the development of Prague Zionism, a schoolfriend of Franz Kafka's, and an intimate of Martin Buber, Judah Leon Magnes and Gershom Scholem. It was from this circle during his stay that he developed views akin to those of Brit Shalom on Jewish-Arab co-operation, though he remained suspicious of fundamentalist Islam.

He obtained his doctorate in linguistics 1935 with a thesis on Arabic word formation (Studien zur arabischen Wurzelgeschichte, "Studies on the History of Arabic Roots"). He then moved to study at the University of Vienna to specialise in Arctic ethnology. With the rise of Nazi antisemitism, he became a refugee and moved to London in 1936 to study with Bronisław Malinowski at the London School of Economics. He returned to Prague in July 1937 and undertook field research on Roma communities for several weeks during a trip in Carpathian Ruthenia, in eastern Czechoslovakia. In 1938, he shifted back to Oxford where he pursued his studies in anthropology, registering for a research degree in the Michaelmas term for 1939–40 on the subject of "A Comparative Study of the Forms of Slavery" at Magdalen College, where Alfred Radcliffe-Brown held the chair of Social Anthropology. During his exile in England he became an intimate of Elias Canetti, to whom he had previously been introduced, in Vienna, by Hans Adler. During the war he studied under Evans-Pritchard, while in turn deeply influencing him and many lecturers and students of that circle, including Meyer Fortes, Mary Douglas, Louis Dumont, Adam Curle, M. N. Srinivas, Paul Bohannan, I.M. Lewis and Godfrey Lienhardt. Iris Murdoch, though she had met him briefly in 1941, fell in love with him in the summer of 1951.

He was appointed Lecturer in Social Anthropology at Oxford in 1949, a position he held until his premature death three years later. The following year he acquired British citizenship. He is mainly known for his posthumous collection Taboo, composed of lectures he delivered on that subject, after being persuaded by Evans-Pritchard to teach this, rather than, as planned, a series of lectures on Marx.

His thought is characterised by an intense commitment to the right of self-determination of non-Western peoples. His analytical technique constantly exposed the descriptive biases of the anthropological tradition which, down to his day, had endeavoured to describe these peoples. He included his own ethnic group, the Jews, in this category. His influence was informal and vast within the tradition of post-war British anthropology, but is rarely attested in the literature because he published little. His one projected and massive book on the sociology of slavery, entitled Servile Institutions, remained uncompleted at his death. The huge original manuscript, with his research materials, was lost in the spring of 1942, when a heavy suitcase he left outside a toilet, while switching trains at Reading, vanished, or, according to one other variation of what became a local tale, someone stole it from a guarded baggage carriage. (Note: An incident similar to Steiner losing his manuscript on a train is recounted in Iris Murdoch's much later novel, An Accidental Man, where the son of the central figure, Austin Gibson Grey, loses the manuscript of his novel when his suitcase is misplaced, or, he suspects, stolen from the baggage carousel after a flight from New York to London.) Steiner had to recompose it from scratch in the succeeding decade for his doctorate. The manuscript, A Comparative Study of the Forms of Slavery, has since been published in digital form by the Bodleian Library, and remains, according to Jeremy Adler, "one of the most insightful studies in the field". His fanatical dedication to meticulous comprehensiveness meant that much of his work remained in manuscript. As Evans-Pritchard wrote in his introduction to Steiner's posthumous masterpiece Taboo, published in 1956, Steiner was reluctant to "publish anything that was not based upon a critical analysis of every source, in whatever language." Others spoke more negatively of his "ultimately misconceived aspirations to encyclopaedic monumentality".

== Ideas ==
From the early 1930s, Steiner embraced the idea, a commonplace of the 18th century and theorised in the work of the sociologist Werner Sombart, that Jewish character was oriental, and held the view that he himself was "an oriental born in the West". Though this perception reflected aspects of his own search for his Jewish identity, it had wider implications. The critique he developed of the imperial cast of Western anthropological writing, and his sympathy for hermeneutic techniques that would recover native terms for the way non-Westerners experienced their world, are grounded in this premise. The approach he propounded allows him to be claimed now as an early theoretical precursor of that mode of critical analysis of ethnographic reports which identified in Orientalism a structure of cognitive prejudice framing Western interpretations of the Other. Indeed, he considered Western civilisation as "fundamentally predatory, in terms both territorial and epistemic, upon civilisations that differ from it."

In his doctoral work on Servile Institutions, he analysed the concept of slavery in similar terms, affirming that the etymology and use of the word itself (Greek sklavenoi, adopted into Latin as sclaveni) associated the condition of slavery with alien peoples, the word Slav referring to people north of the Balkans, an association that still survives in both English and German. The Western construction of "slavery", in his view, served as an excuse to enslave any other society or group the dominant power in the West might consider as either oriental, savage or primitive.

In his keynote work on the concept and historical denotations of taboo, Steiner pointed out a major difficulty, at once functional and theoretical, in the English tradition of social anthropology. It was, especially under Radcliffe-Brown, who affirmed a key distinction between historical and sociological method in the discipline and practice of anthropology, dedicated to intensive empirical fieldwork on the total social structure and cultural forms of less developed societies, but was, at the same time, deeply involved in the theoretical elaboration of a science of comparative sociology. Steiner was particularly interested in drawing attention to the fact that "the meaning of words appearing in the terminologies of comparative and analytic sociology" had "drifted apart without our noticing it."

In earlier times, one had field reports from missionaries, resident consular officials and travellers about the customs, languages and institutions of a people. In the hands of metropolitan arm-chair specialists, these variegated materials, collected in such famous compendia as J. G. Frazer's The Golden Bough, were thoroughly studied to elicit theories and concepts of a general descriptive nature about primitive society and its institutions, such as totemism, or taboo. Somewhere along the line, the large theoretical baggage that had developed from this division of tasks proved too abstract, unfocused and dysfunctional for carrying out analytical enquiries into specific societies. "Totemism", for example, was no longer useful in its Victorian sense of a broad category with universal reach throughout "primitive societies", though one could examine how a totemic rite or practice might function in situ, within one society or an other. How then was the modern social anthropologist to face this dilemma, of conducting concrete anthropological analysis in particular societies, with the requirement to further a comparative study of all societies, when the terms of analysis at his disposal were so deeply contaminated by shopworn language and outworn implications? Steiner phrases the issue in the following terms:

If we strip out vocabulary of these significant terms of the comparative period, what are we going to put in their place, not only as labels for pigeon-holes, but also as expressions indicating the direction of our interest? We do retain them and, sooner or later, each of us in his own way makes the unpleasant discovery that he is talking in two different languages at the same time and, like all bilinguals, finds translation almost impossible. (Note: In Iris Murdoch's novel, The Flight from the Enchanter, the figure of Peter Saward, who is thought to be modelled on Franz Steiner, is depicted as a scholar deeply engaged in trying to decipher an obscure ancient language without the assistance of a bilingual. The last scene in The Flight from the Enchanter especially is said to evoke, under disguised form, his proposal of marriage to Murdoch, though there it is the woman who proposes, and Saward who turns the idea down. His friend Elias Canetti was the model for Mischa Fox in the same novel.)

In his work, he set about to systematically disentangle the problems arising for anthropology from these historic shifts in descriptive traditions and key analytical terminology, focusing particularly on terms like taboo and magic. According to Mary Douglas, in his lectures on the subject Steiner argued that, (a) with regard to the comparative study of religion, one must abolish the established division of religion into a rational, enlightened area dealing with theology and ethics, and an exotic or alien sphere where taboo and magic were prominent. He also maintained that (b) religion was a "total cosmology, concerned with active principles of all kinds", and finally (c) he analysed the phenomenon of the sacred in terms of a status of relationship, often being in his view a "hedge or boundary-marking" circumscribing the idea of divine power, adducing in this regard the way the Hebrew qodesh, the Latin sacer, and the Polynesian tabu which lend themselves to such an approach. Taboos were essentially "rules of avoidance which express danger attitudes". This was a considerable advance on the view, commonplace at that time that taboos were emblematic of neurotic trends in primitive society. Robert Parker, paraphrasing Steiner, observes:-

The system of taboo is not, as it has seemed to some observers, the product of a cultural neurosis, but a way in which "attitudes to values are expressed in terms of dangers".

In his dissertation on slavery, he showed how goods with a purely utilitarian value are "translated" into ritual and ceremonial values which then form the basis of power in several preliterate societies.

His anthropological analysis of taboo had larger implications, which emerge in his remarks on the sociology of danger, and extends to the phenomenon of the rise of Nazism within modern civilisation. He defined civilisation, commonly understood in terms of an outcome of historical progress, as rather "the march of danger into the heart of creation". Michael Mack remarks that:

In contrast to Norbert Elias, Steiner did not depict the movement of civilization in terms of a development that grew out of the West and progressively enriched the developing world. Rather, Steiner conceptualized Occidental history in terms of an ever-increasing demolition of social structures that sets limits to danger and violence. He focused on what he saw as civilization's ambivalence: on the one hand, the progress of modern history helps expand the limits of society; on the other, this expansion opens the door to unlimited forms of power and destruction. The limitless violence perpetrated in the Nazi genocide coincides with the absolute identification of power with danger.

== Zionism and the letter to Mahatma Gandhi ==
Steiner's struggle to define his Jewish identity, especially as that was inflected by the shock of the Holocaust, and his relation to the Zionist project, were given extensive expression in a letter he wrote to Mahatma Gandhi in 1946.

The occasion was provided by the publication, in the London Jewish Chronicle, of an abridgement of Gandhi's final remarks on the question of Jewish relations with the Arabs of Palestine, which had been printed in his English-language journal Harijan on 21 July 1946. What complicated Steiner's reply was the fact that, in the meantime, the Irgun had blown up the King David Hotel in Jerusalem, and in carrying Gandhi's remarks on 26 July, the Jewish Chronicle took note of the incident to contextualise Gandhi's position on non-violence.

Gandhi had taken Jews to be a European people. However, for Steiner, "the Jews as a collectivity constitute an alterity internalised by the West in the course of its expansion", and he believed indeed that "the fact of anti-Semitism is essential for the understanding of Christian Europe; it is a main thread in that fabric". Therefore, Gandhi's view of Zionism as a matter of "a European-sponsored people in conflict with an Asiatic (Arab) people", Steiner argued, evinced a failure to perceive the peculiar internal domination of Jews-qua-Orientals, within European civilisation. It followed for him that Gandhi's counsel that, in the face of violence, the Jews adopt the tactic of satyagraha would only function if there were a commitment by the dominant to the survival of the Jewish internal minority whom they had historically oppressed. This commitment, however, was wholly lacking, in Steiner's view, from Western history and Christendom, and the idea of a policy of "victorious martyrdom" was out of the question. To the contrary, Steiner deeply admired figures like Yigael Yadin, as exemplifying the strong, activist Zionist values the historical situation of the Jews demanded.

Yet his Zionism was not that of a secularised state. It was a mistake, he believed, to endeavour to establish a European state in Palestine, as conceived by Theodor Herzl, as opposed to the cultural state envisaged by Ahad Ha-Am. To do so would constitute a move tantamount to adopting an "alien fanaticism" and thus Steiner argued, in Adler and Fardon's words, that:

this fundamental struggle between emulation and withdrawal will depend on struggles between East and West in a triple sense: between Eastern and Western Jewry, the Jews and Europe, and between solidarity with other Asian nations "against the European ideology in us".

Towards the end of his life, Steiner came to embrace strongly the idea that it was necessary to create a theocratic state in Israel. Without such a grounding in traditional Jewish values, the Zionist project was, he thought, doomed to founder.

== Final years and legacy ==
Shy by nature (one student recalled that he "lived in a world of abstract clarity, where people were an irrelevant clutter"), whimsical, and endlessly curious, he was regarded by many of his contemporaries as an "intellectual's intellectual" for the extraordinary multidisciplinary erudition he had at his fingertips. He was apparently engaged in teaching himself to read Chinese at the time of his death.

Over recent decades, research has brought to light the extensive influence his person, teaching and writings had on colleagues. David Mills has recently written of him as one of the great "what ifs" of anthropology, asking, "What if Franz Steiner, Czech refugee and author of an influential work on taboo, had not died at the tender age of 44?" [sic]. His preliminary work on the ethnography of Somalia, for example, inspired his student, Ioan M. Lewis, who inherited his papers on this subject, to specialise in that society, on which he was to become a world-ranking authority. His Taboo had a decisive impact on Mary Douglas, and her recent biographer calls it "the crucial point of departure" for her early study Purity and Danger (1966). Philosopher Alasdair MacIntyre also credits Steiner's views on morality for influencing his own.

Norman Snaith argues that Steiner's work cannot be appreciated if one ignores the personal tragedy that informed his life.

He was a victim of Nazi tyranny. When Hitler overran Czechoslovakia, Steiner escaped with nothing but his life. He lost family, property, and all the results of earlier research. He never recovered from his privations and his sense of isolation, and he died at the age of 43. Oxford is the home of lost causes; during the years of Nazi horror, she proved herself also to be the home of lost men. She provided a home for him, and a lectureship, but she could not give him life.

His family was exterminated during the Holocaust. His health in the last decade, due to stress and poverty, was always delicate. He suffered a nervous breakdown in 1946, and a coronary thrombosis in 1949. He died of a heart attack, while speaking to an acquaintance over the phone, in 1952, just after Iris Murdoch had accepted his proposal of marriage. She attributed his death to the effects of the Holocaust, remarking that "Franz was certainly one of Hitler's victims". Peter J. Conradi wrote that Steiner never recovered from the sadness he felt when his parents were murdered in a concentration camp. According to Conradi, Murdoch's portraits of such positive figures in her fiction as Peter Saward (The Flight from the Enchanter, 1956), Willy Kost (The Nice and the Good, 1968) and Tallis Browne (A Fairly Honourable Defeat, 1970) were inspired by her memories of Franz Steiner.

He is buried in the Jewish cemetery in Oxford. His collection of books on anthropology were, by testament, donated to the Library of the Hebrew University of Jerusalem.

== Sources ==
- Adler, H. G. (2006), Adler, Jeremy; Tully, Carol Lisa (eds.), Über Franz Baermann Steiner: Brief an Chaim Rabin (in German), Wallstein Verlag, ISBN 978-3-8353-0028-6
- Adler, Jeremy; Fardon, Richard (2022). Franz Baermann Steiner : a stranger in the world. New York: Berghahn. ISBN 9781800732704.
- Adler, Jeremy; Fardon, Richard; Tully, Carol, eds. (2003). From Prague poet to oxford anthropologist : Franz Baermann Steiner celebrated : essays and translations. München: Iudicium. ISBN 3891296851.
- Adler, Jeremy (22 July 2022). "Slavery". Letters to the Editor. Times Literary Supplement.
- Adler, Jeremy; Fardon, Richard (1999), "An Oriental in the West: The Life of Franz Baermann Steiner", in Adler, Jeremy; Fardon, Richard (eds.), Franz Baermann Steiner: Selected Writings, vol. 1, Berghahn Books, ISBN 978-1-57181-711-2 – via Internet Archive
- Conradi, Peter J. (2001), Iris Murdoch: a life, W. W. Norton & Company, ISBN 978-0-393-04875-9
- Douglas, Mary (1999), "Franz Steiner: A Memoir", in Adler, Jeremy; Fardon, Richard (eds.), Franz Baermann Steiner: Selected Writings, vol. 1, Berghahn Books, ISBN 978-1-57181-711-2 – via Internet Archive
- Fardon, Richard (2002), Mary Douglas: an intellectual biography, Routledge, ISBN 978-0-203-02022-7
- Fardon, Richard; Adler, Jeremy (1999), "Orientpolitik, Value, and Civilisation: The Anthropological Thought of Franz Baermann Steiner", in Adler, Jeremy; Fardon, Richard (eds.), Franz Baermann Steiner: Selected Writings, vol. 2, Berghahn Books, ISBN 978-1-57181-714-3 – via Internet Archive
- Franz Baermann Steiner. Translated by Hamburger, Michael. London: King's College London, University of London. 1992.
- Humphreys, S. C. (2005) [First published 1978], Anthropology and the Greeks, Theory of anthropology, vol. 6, Routledge, ISBN 978-0-415-33064-0
- Kuper, Adam (1988), The Invention of Primitive Society: Transformations of an Illusion, Routledge, ISBN 978-0-14-026492-0
- Lewis, I. M. (1994), Blood and bone: the call of kinship in Somali society, The Red Sea Press, ISBN 978-0-932415-93-6
- Mack, Michael (2001). Anthropology as memory : Elias Canetti's and Franz Baermann Steiner's responses to the Shoah. Tübingen: Max Niemeyer Verlag. ISBN 9783110965964.
- Mack, Michael (2003), German idealism and the Jew: the inner anti-semitism of philosophy and German Jewish responses, University of Chicago Press, ISBN 978-0-226-50094-2
- Mack, Michael (2004), "Canetti's Response to the Shoah: Masse und Macht", in Lorenz, Dagmar C. G (ed.), A companion to the works of Elias Canetti, Camden House, ISBN 978-1-57113-234-5
- Mills, David (2008), Difficult folk?: a political history of social anthropology, Berghahn Books, ISBN 978-1-84545-450-0
- Murdoch, Iris (1973) [First published 1971], An Accidental Man, Penguin, ISBN 978-0-14-003611-4
- Murdoch, Iris (1999), Conradi, Peter J (ed.), Existentialists and mystics: writings on philosophy and literature, Penguin Group, ISBN 978-0-14-026492-0
- Parker, Robert (1990) [First published 1983], Miasma: pollution and purification in early Greek religion, Oxford University Press, ISBN 978-0-19-814742-8
- Patterson, Orlando (1982), Slavery and social death: a comparative study, Harvard University Press, ISBN 978-0-674-81083-9
- Ryan, D'Arcy (1992), "Meeting the Mendi", in Hays, Terrence E (ed.), Ethnographic presents: pioneering anthropologists in the Papua New Guinea Highlands, University of California Press, ISBN 978-0-520-07745-4
- Snaith, Norman H. (June 1958), "Review: Taboo", Journal of Biblical Literature, 77 (2): 184, doi:10.2307/3264613, JSTOR 3264613
- Sombart, Werner (1982) [First published 1911], Die Juden und das Wirtschaftsleben [The Jews and Modern Capitalism] (in German), Transaction Publishers, ISBN 978-0-87855-837-7
- Sontag, Susan (1980), Under the Sign of Saturn, Vintage Books
- Srinivas, M. N. (1999), "Franz Steiner: A Memoir", in Adler, Jeremy; Fardon, Richard (eds.), Franz Baermann Steiner: Selected Writings, vol. 2, Berghahn Books, ISBN 978-1-57181-714-3 – via Internet Archive
- Steiner, Franz Baermann (1949a). A Comparative Study of the Forms of Slavery, pp.1-197 (Thesis). Oxford University Research Archive.
- Steiner, Franz Baermann (1949b). A Comparative Study of the Forms of Slavery, pp.198-388 (Thesis). Oxford University Research Archive.
- Steiner, Franz Baermann (1999) [First published 1946], "Letter to Mr. Gandhi", in Adler, Jeremy; Fardon, Richard (eds.), Franz Baermann Steiner: Selected Writings, vol. 2, Berghahn Books, ISBN 978-1-57181-714-3 – via Internet Archive
- Steiner, Franz Baermann (2000), Adler, Jeremy (ed.), Am stürzenden Pfad: gesammelte Gedichte (in German), Wallstein Verlag, ISBN 978-3-89244-411-4
- Steiner, Franz Baermann (2004) [First published 1956], Bohannan, Laura (ed.), Taboo, Routledge, ISBN 978-0-415-33040-4
- Steiner, Franz Baermann; Douglas, Mary (1999), Taboo, truth and religion, vol. 1–2, Berghahn Books, ISBN 978-1-57181-712-9
- Turner, Stephen P. (2003), "MacIntyre's Damascus: In the Province of the Philosophy of the Social Sciences", in Murphy, Mark C. (ed.), Alasdair MacIntyre, Cambridge University Press, pp. 70–93, ISBN 978-052179381-0
- Widdows, Heather (2005), The moral vision of Iris Murdoch, Ashgate Publishing, ISBN 978-0-7546-3625-0
- Wilson, A. N. (2003), Iris Murdoch as I knew her, Hutchinson, ISBN 978-0-09-174246-1 – via Internet Archive
