= Taboo (disambiguation) =

A taboo is a social prohibition or ban.

Taboo may also refer to:

== Film, television, and plays ==
- Taboo (1922 play), by Mary Hoyt Wiborg
- Taboo (film series), a 1980s series of pornographic movies
- Taboo (1980 film), the first of the above series
- Taboo (1999 film), a Japanese film
- Taboo (2002 film), an American film
- Taboo (2015 film), an Iranian film
- Taboo (musical), a 2002 play about the life of Boy George
- Taboo (2002 TV series), a documentary series on National Geographic Channel
- Taboo (2017 TV series), a period drama on BBC One
- Taboo (Australian TV series), a comedic series on Network 10

== Literature ==
- Taboo (book), a book containing a series of lectures on the subject by Franz Baermann Steiner
- Taboo (comics), an anthology published by Stephen R. Bissette

== Music ==
=== Artists ===
- Taboo (rapper) (born 1975), member of The Black Eyed Peas
- Taboo (group), a German Eurodance group

=== Albums ===
- Taboo (Buck-Tick album), 1989
- Taboo (Ronald Shannon Jackson album), 1990
- Taboo, an album by Max Koffler, 2008
- Taboo!, a 2009 album by Jonny Blu

=== Songs ===
- "Taboo" (Christabelle Borg song), a song that represented Malta in the Eurovision Song Contest 2018
- "Taboo" (Don Omar song), 2011
- "Taboo" (Glamma Kid song), 1999
- "Taboo" (Kumi Koda song), 2008
- "Taboo" or "Tabú", Afro-Cuban song by Margarita Lecuona, covered by many others
- "Taboo" a song by Santana from Santana, 1971
- "Taboo", a song by Claudia Christian, 1998
- "Taboo", a song by Diaura from Focus, 2013
- "Taboo", a song by Kylie Minogue from Tension II, 2024
- "Taboo", a song by September from Dancing Shoes, 2007

== Other uses ==
- Taboo (drink), a vodka based liqueur with wine and tropical fruit juices
- Taboo (game), a 1989 word guessing party game
- Taboo: The Sixth Sense, a 1989 tarot reading video game by Rare

== See also ==
- Tabo (disambiguation)
- Tabou (disambiguation)
- Tabu
- Tabuu, the final boss in Super Smash Bros. Brawl
- Ta13oo, album by Denzel Curry
- Word taboo
