= Kpotè =

Kpotè Potè
- Village
- Location in Ivory Coast
- Coordinates: 4°52′N 6°32′W
- Country: Ivory Coast
- District: Bas-Sassandra
- Region: San-Pédro
- Department: San-Pédro
- Sub-prefecture: San-Pédro
- Time zone: UTC+0 (GMT)

Kpotè (also spelled Potè) is a village in south-western Ivory Coast. It is in the sub-prefecture of San-Pédro, San-Pédro Department, San-Pédro Region, Bas-Sassandra District. The village is approximately nine kilometres inland from the coast.

Kpotè was a commune until March 2012, when it became one of 1,126 communes nationwide that were abolished.
