= Para, Ivory Coast =

Para
- Village
- Location in Ivory Coast
- Coordinates: 5°31′N 7°20′W
- Country: Ivory Coast
- District: Bas-Sassandra
- Region: Nawa
- Department: Soubré
- Sub-prefecture: Soubré

Population (2014 census)
  - Village: 17,594
- Time zone: UTC+0 (GMT)

Para is a village is southwestern Ivory Coast. It is in the sub-prefecture of Djouroutou, Tabou Department, San-Pédro Region, Bas-Sassandra District.

Para was a commune from October 2005 until March 2012, when it became one of 1,126 communes nationwide that were abolished.

== History ==
Following the disputed November 2010 election, there were armed attacks near Para across the Liberian border by disaffected Ivorian soldiers and their Liberian comrades. In June 2012 these attacks intensified when seven United Nations peacekeepers, an Ivorian soldier, and at least ten civilians were killed in the nearby village of Saho on 8 June. Over 7,000 refugees flooded into Para.

== Economy ==
Cacao is the main cash crop in the Para area.
