= Robert Paine (anthropologist) =

Canadian anthropologist

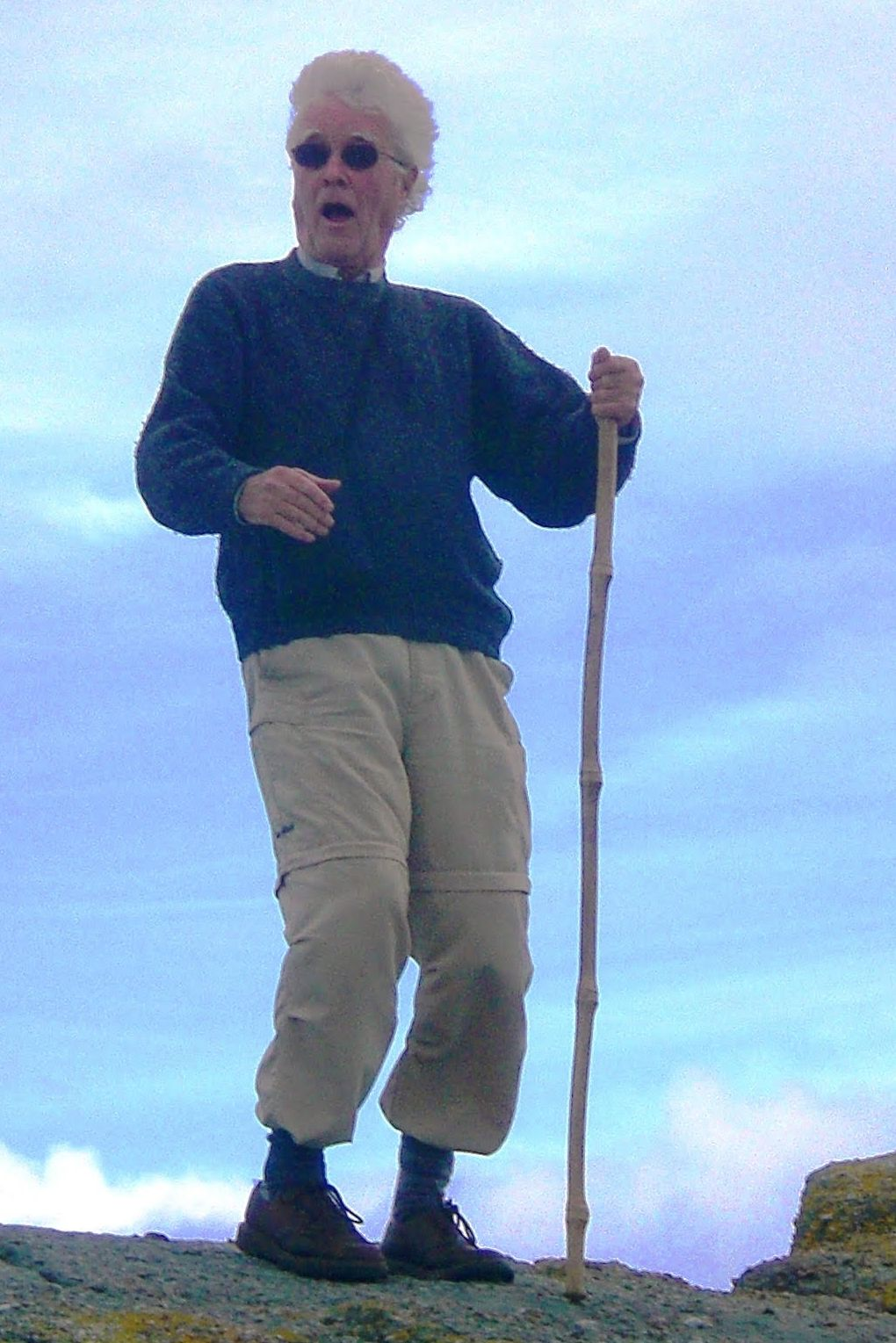
- Robert Paine at Logy Bay, Newfoundland, 2008
- Born: Robert Patrick Barten Paine; 10 April 1926; Portsmouth, Great Britain
- Died: 8 July 2010 (aged 81); St. John's, Newfoundland and Labrador
- Education: University of Oxford (BA, M. Phil and D. Phil)
- Scientific career
- Fields: Anthropology
- Workplaces: Memorial University of Newfoundland
- Doctoral advisor: Franz Baermann Steiner

Robert Patrick Barten Paine (April 10, 1926 – July 8, 2010) was a British-born Canadian anthropologist whose primary areas of study were the Saami people of northern Scandinavia and the Inuit, though he also published on topics as diverse as the Jewish settlers of the West Bank and the purpose of gossip. He served as chair of the combined departments of Sociology and Anthropology at Memorial University of Newfoundland.

== Biography ==
Robert Paine was born in Portsmouth, England on April 10, 1926. At age 17 he joined the Royal Marines as a paratrooper. In August 1945 he was part of the campaign to reclaim Hong Kong from the Japanese. After the war he studied at Oxford where he received his BA, M.Phil. and D.Phil., studying under Franz Steiner and E. E. Evans-Pritchard.

For his dissertation research Paine worked in Finnmark, resulting in "a two-volume monograph, Coast Lapp Society I (1957) and Coast Lapp Society II (1965), portraying a coastal Saami community in peripheral north Norway on the brink of economic and political integration in the wider society." He supported himself during this time as a reindeer herder and went on to live with and study nomadic Saami groups. Paine's studies of Saami culture are considered so thorough there are reports of Saami families using them to educate their own children.

Paine taught at universities in Norway before being offered the position of chair of the combined departments of Sociology and Anthropology at Memorial University of Newfoundland in 1965. He was also named Director of the Institute for Social and Economic Research, "which he developed as a vibrant center of scholarship and publication, attracting many exciting scholars and making a significant impact on Memorial's international reputation."

In his 1977 book The White Arctic, Paine develops the theory of Welfare Colonialism, detailing how investments in the health, education, employment and welfare of indigenous inhabitants of the Canadian Arctic had perverse effects, lowering living standards and weakening traditional institutions of support. This theory was embraced by anthropologists in other countries who used it to explain similar situations in Australia and elsewhere.

Paine was often involved in public advocacy based on his research, authoring a report opposing the Norwegian government's plan to dam the Alta River, which would adversely affect nomadic reindeer herding, as well as warning against the impact of the Chernobyl disaster on reindeer populations. Paine has stated that the intended audience for his work on welfare colonialism in the Canadian Arctic was "policymakers in Ottawa" who had the power to address the situation. He later became involved in using the tools of anthropology to try to understand and explain the complexity and volatility of Israeli settlements.

Paine maintained lifelong professional and personal friendships with the Norwegian social anthropologist Frederik Barth, whose ideas Paine critiqued in one of his works, and the British social anthropologist Anthony Cohen, who wrote a memorial for him.

== Works ==
Paine published over sixty articles and is the author of twelve books:

- Coast Lapp Society I: A Study of a Neighbourhood In Revsbotn Fjord, Universitetsforlaget, Tromsø, Norway, 1957
- Coast Lapp Society II: A Study of Economic Development and Social Values, Universitetsforlaget, Tromsø, Norway, 1965
- Patrons and Brokers in the East Arctic, Institute of Social and Economic Research, Memorial University of Newfoundland, St. John's, 1971
- Second Thoughts About Barth's Models, Royal Anthropological Institute, London, 1974
- The White Arctic: Anthropological Essays on Tutelage and Ethnicity, Institute of Social and Economic Research, Memorial University of Newfoundland, St. John's, 1977
- Ayatollahs & Turkey Trots: Political Rhetoric in the New Newfoundland: Crosbie, Jamieson, and Peckford Breakwater, St. John's, 1981
- Politically Speaking: Cross-Cultural Studies of Rhetoric, Institute for the Study of Human Issues, Philadelphia, 1981
- Dam a River, Damn a People?: Saami (Lapp) livelihood and the Alta/Kautokeino Hydro-Electric Project and the Norwegian Parliament, International Work Group for Indigenous Affairs, Copenhagen, 1982
- Advocacy and Anthropology, First Encounters, Institute of Social and Economic Research, Memorial University of Newfoundland, St. John's, 1985
- Herds of the Tundra: a Portrait of Saami Reindeer Pastoralism, Smithsonian Institution Press, Washington, 1994
- Camps of the Tundra: Politics Through Reindeer Among Saami Pastoralists, Smithsonian Institution Press, Washington, 2009

== Recognition and honors ==
- Fellowship of the Royal Society
- Membership of the Order of Canada
- Honorary doctorates from:
  - University of Edinburgh
  - University of Tromsø – The Arctic University of Norway
  - Memorial University of Newfoundland
- Fellowship of the Norwegian Academy of Science and Letters (1988).

== Personal life ==
Paine was married four times. His first wife, Inger-Anna Gunnare, was a Saami woman whom he met during his fieldwork in Norway. They later divorced. He met and married his second wife, Sonia Kuryliw, in St. John's, Newfoundland in the early 1970s. They also divorced. Paine met his third wife, the anthropologist and refugee advocate Lisa Gilad, in Israel while teaching at Hebrew University. She died in a road accident in 1996. His fourth wife, the Israeli writer, lawyer and human rights activist Rachel Kimor, returned with Paine to live in St. John's. She died in 2007 following a protracted struggle with cancer. Paine was known for his love of the outdoors and was a lifelong birdwatcher. He also enjoyed energetic walks with his dogs.
