= Dogbo =

- Town and sub-prefecture
- Location in Ivory Coast
- Coordinates: 4°57′N 7°3′W
- Country: Ivory Coast
- District: Bas-Sassandra
- Region: San-Pédro
- Department: San-Pédro

Population (2014)
  - Total: 37,391
- Time zone: UTC+0 (GMT)

Dogbo is a town in south-western Ivory Coast. It is a sub-prefecture of San-Pédro Department in San-Pédro Region, Bas-Sassandra District.

The far northern part of the sub-prefecture lies within Taï National Park.

Dogbo was a commune until March 2012, when it became one of 1,126 communes nationwide that were abolished. In 2014, the population of the sub-prefecture of Dogbo was 37,391.

== Villages ==
The seven villages of the sub-prefecture of Dogbo and their population in 2014 are:

1. Bloho (1,797)
2. Boua (4,056)
3. Dogbo (8,634)
4. Gléré (3,536)
5. Gnépasso (12,216)
6. Magnery (6,021)
7. Mana (1,131)
