= Olodio =

Town and sub-prefecture in Ivory Coast

- Town and sub-prefecture
- Location in Ivory Coast
- Coordinates: 4°43′N 7°28′W
- Country: Ivory Coast
- District: Bas-Sassandra
- Region: San-Pédro
- Department: Tabou

Population (2014)
  - Total: 15,824
- Time zone: UTC+0 (GMT)

Olodio is a town in southwestern Ivory Coast. It is a sub-prefecture of Tabou Department in San-Pédro Region, Bas-Sassandra District. The town is 10 kilometres east of the border with Liberia.

Olodio was a commune until March 2012, when it became one of 1,126 communes nationwide that were abolished.

In 2014, the population of the sub-prefecture of Olodio was 15,824.

== Villages ==
The twenty six villages of the sub-prefecture of Olodio and their population in 2014 are:

1. Blidouba (1,702)
2. Dahioké (545)
3. Déwaké V4 (370)
4. Déwaké Village (1,025)
5. Donié (302)
6. Gbaouloké (210)
7. Gbapé (138)
8. Ibo 2 (265)
9. Idioké (707)
10. Irato (419)
11. Kétoké (346)
12. Klodio (684)
13. Leproserie Ibole (38)
14. Méré (155)
15. Niro (459)
16. Olodio (4,285)
17. Ouédébo (754)
18. Pounié 1 (377)
19. Pounié 2 (515)
20. Sèh (615)
21. Tanouplou (210)
22. Taouloké (98)
23. Taté 1 (143)
24. Taté 2 (249)
25. Tépo Iboké (1,084)
26. Yédè (129)
