= Taboo (book) =

Monograph based on a series of lectures by Franz Steiner

- Title page for Taboo (1956)
- Author: Franz Steiner
- Subject: Social anthropology
- Publisher: Cohen & West
- Publication date: 1956

Taboo is a monograph based on a series of lectures by Franz Steiner, now considered to be a classic in the field of social anthropology. The volume was published posthumously, edited by Steiner's student Laura Bohannan, and the first edition, brought out in 1956, contained a preface by his mentor E. E. Evans-Pritchard. The lectures analyze one of the great problematic terms of modern ethnography, that of taboo, derived from the Polynesian word tapu, adopted by Western scholars to refer to a generic set of ritual inhibitions governing what was thought to be primitive society or the ‘savage mind’.

== Structure of the Book ==
Steiner traces the rise of scholarly interest in taboo, from the age of British exploration of the Pacific islands, through to Robertson Smith and Sigmund Freud. He highlights the paradox that 19th century British analyses of the topic were governed by stringent rationality, and yet issued from a society, that of Victorian England, which was itself taboo-ridden. In his opening remarks Steiner argues that key terms within the discipline of anthropology, such as taboo, totemism, joking relationship and avoidance create for the modern scholar a dilemma. Because these words are used very broadly, they are, he maintains, too inexact in their denotation to mean anything, and therefore we must either abandon them as too vague or imprecise, or otherwise retain them at the considerable risk of creating or maintaining fundamental misunderstandings. Steiner’s basic thesis is that,

‘The word has been used in situations differing markedly from those in which it was derived by many who were either ignorant of or disregarded the varieties of usage it had in Polynesia; and that it has been redefined to suit the thought systems of the users.'

It was therefore the generalized application of a specific indigenous term to encompass phenomena from other societies that Steiner found deeply problematical. He took particular note of J.G. Frazer's idea that taboo was,

’the name given to a series of religious prohibitions which attained its fullest development in Polynesia, but of which under different names, traces can be discovered in most parts of the world.'

The customs that lie behind taboo represent neither a single institution nor a sociological problem. The word was used to describe many distinct practices, such as one’s right over objects, a royal minister’s power to select what crops were to be sown and farmed, and the relations of supreme chiefs to petty dignitaries ‘in terms of delegated interdiction rather than delegated authority’. The essential function of taboos was, in Steiner's view, that of narrowing down and localizing danger.

Steiner’s own definition of taboo is incomplete. Indeed, the title is somewhat misleading since there is little positive information about taboo, as Steiner essentially devoted most of his exposition to a critical survey of the methodology employed by writers on the topic since the time of Captain Cook down to his time. His untimely death did not allow him to provide a complete elaboration of his own theory, and the elliptic summary of his approach towards the end of the book is rather obscure in that it is there defined as “an element of all those situations in which attitudes to values are expressed in terms of danger behaviour”. That certain defined situations are imbued with danger is not in itself the product of some intrinsic relations between the organism, its state of mind, and the environment, but rather as often as not such dangerous situation are, for Steiner, so defined purely as a consequence of sociological processes. He emphasizes the primacy of taboos as performing a function in the maintenance of social structures over subjective attitudes that might be considered the cause of taboos themselves.

Taboo, for Steiner, is concerned with four things, (1) with social mechanisms of obedience having ritual significance (2) specific restrictive behaviour in situations that are deemed dangerous (3) with the protection of individuals exposed to such danger, and (4) the protection of society at large from those of its members who are both endangered by taboo violations and therefore, in turn, dangerous. Hence Steiner’s general definition that ‘taboo is an element of all those situations in which attitudes to values are expressed in terms of danger behaviour’

In the first three chapters, Steiner describes taboo in Polynesia, surveying how Captain James Cook first used the term on his third voyage to the area, and the way in which it was gradually incorporated into European languages, together with a ‘brilliant, if brief’ examination of the relation between power, mana, taboo, and noa.^{[i]} He argues that, from the outset, the Polynesian usage of the term was contaminated by refraction through a false European dichotomy, that split the notion of taboo into two distinct categories, of the ‘forbidden' and the 'sacred, whereas in Polynesia they were two inseparable aspects of the one concept, though mutually exclusive.

Steiner then surveys, in successive chapters, the way the adopted concept of taboo became a "Victorian problem”. Steiner observed acutely that it took a Protestant (Cook) to first observe the problem of taboo, whereas, by contrast, Spanish explorers, as Catholics, were never sufficiently ‘bemused’ to think it worthy of mention. He then remarks on the irony of the fact that the ‘invention’ of the problem of taboo was an achievement of Victorian society, which he defined as “one of the most taboo-minded and taboo-ridden societies on record”.^{[Ii]} He cites among the armchair theorizers of that period responsible for creating the interpretation of taboo as a general feature of primitive society, W. Robertson Smith, Sir James Frazer, and R.R.Marett, the last-named being responsible for the idea that tabu was negative mana. Steiner himself had a thorough background in Semitic languages, and therefore his chapters on Robertson Smith, who applied the concept to Semitic cultures, have been regarded of ‘outstanding importance’.

The book concludes with two chapters, one on Sigmund Freud and William Wundt, and the other on Arnold Van Gennep and Radcliffe-Brown, who was one of Steiner’s teachers, and also a section on Margaret Mead.

According to Joseph Politella, Steiner, in equating taboo with the Hebraic concept of qadosh ('separated unto God'), makes an inference that taboos of this kind may 'have been originally inspired by awe of the supernatural, and that they were intended to restrain men from the use of that of which the Divine power or powers were jealous. Politella would therefore interpret Steiner’s position as marked by a certain duality, in which taboo was at times imposed by charismatic kings and priests on objects, and yet, at times, emerged from social life as restrictive sanctions. This distinction, he argued, can be seen in Steiner’s approach, which discriminates on the one hand between taboos at a lower level as powers exercised by rulers and priest-kings in antiquity, that invest and proscribe certain objects as sacred property, and, on the other, taboos that, more commonly, function as restrictions which derive their power from the sanctions of social life.

== Critical reception ==
Reviewers, from a variety of critical perspectives, are unanimous in noting that Steiner’s premature death was a loss to scholarship given the erudite trenchancy of his analytical acumen. Norman Snaith remarked that it was a tragedy ‘that he died before his own thinking reached a constructive stage.’ For S. G. F. Brandon, ‘(p)erhaps the fairest estimate of this book is to regard it as prolegomena to a great study of taboo which will, unhappily, not now be written by Franz Steiner’. Assessments of his style however vary. For Fred Cottrell, it was ‘very lucid and witty’. For Katharine Luomala, the book was ‘highly organized, closely reasoned, and tightly written’, though his ‘sentences are really so jammed with content as to make for rather slow and heavy going (reading) and often raise doubt as to one’s comprehension of his meaning’. S.G. F. Brandon, noting Evans-Pritchard’s remark on the way Steiner’s omnivorous erudition and fanatical search for comprehensiveness slowed the publication of his research, thought it ‘not an easy book to read, partly owing to that obscurity of expression which so often marks the writing of a scholar in a language of which he has an apparent command but which is not his native tongue.’ But it was precisely the compactness of his thought which endowed the work with peculiar value, for ‘in its analysis it is most thorough and no tacit assumption nor loose logic in argument is allowed to pass unexamined’. Joseph Politella, to the contrary, regarded the work as a ‘brilliant exposition, along historical and sociological lines, of the custom of taboo’. In Norman Snaith’s judgement, a proper appreciation of the book could not ignore the tragedy of Steiner’s personal life, as a victim of Nazi tyranny. In this sense, his criticisms of both Robertson Smith and Frazer as thinkers whose ideas were thoroughly embedded in the values of the period they themselves lived and worked in may be applied as a criterion, mutatis mutandis, to Steiner’s own work. ‘A naturally acute and critical mind has been sharpened to a razor-edge by his privations. This is why his criticisms are so severe, and occasionally super-punctilious. Cora Du Bois characterized Steiner’s ‘critical reasoning’ as ‘subtle and involuted, at times to the point of obscurity, and the critical mood is predominantly captious’, but affirmed that, ‘(n)evertheless, these lectures are of a high intellectual order and occasionally possess passages of literary merit’.

== Errors, misprints, oversights ==
- Mana as in ‘mana and tapu’ on page 41 should read ‘noa and tapu’
- Mare/more are used for marae
- Atooi Island is identified as Atui, whereas it refers to Kauai in the Hawaiian Islands.
- The idea that commoners could give the names of important chiefs to their pet animals to prevent them from being killed is improbable, since the King would kill both the person and his pet for equating him with an animal
- S.G.F. Brandon wondered why Steiner failed to pay attention to the work of Rudolf Otto, esp. his influential Idea of the Holy (1917).
- S.G.F. Brandon argues that, curiously for someone with a background in Semitic philology, Steiner omitted analysing the ‘striking examples of taboo-peril in I Samuel VI.19, and Books of 11 Samuel VI, 6-7. However, Norman Snaith considered that his studies constituted ‘a definite help in the study of the holiness-taboo-uncleanness complex of Leviticus.’

== Endnotes ==
i.	Noa means 'that which is unrestricted, free from tapu’'. See Patrick Vinton Kirch, Roger Curtis Green, Hawaiki, ancestral Polynesia: an essay in historical anthropology, Cambridge University Press, 2001 pp. 239–40, p. 240

iI.	For the 'invention of traditions' see Eric Hobsbawm and Terence Ranger (eds.), The Invention of Tradition, Cambridge University Press, 1983
