= Tabo =

Tabo may refer to:

== Places ==
- Tabo (Nubia), an archaeological mound site in Nubia, Sudan
- Tabo, Himachal Pradesh, a small town in Himachal Pradesh, India
  - Tabo Monastery
- Tabo, Mueang Phetchabun a sub-district of Mueang Phetchabun District in Phetchabun Province, Central Thailand
- Tabo Creek, Lafayette County, Missouri
- El Tabo, a commune in Valparaíso Region, Chile

== Other uses ==
- Tabo (hygiene), traditional Filipino hygiene tool
- Tabo language or Waia, language of Papua New Guinea
- Willughbeia sarawacensis, a tropical fruit called tabo in the Philippines
- Christian Tabó (born 1993), Uruguayan footballer

== See also ==
- Thabo, given name
- Taboo (disambiguation)
