= Paras =

Paras may refer to:

== People ==
- Parshvanatha, 23rd Tirthankara of Jainism
- Paras Shah, former Crown Prince of Nepal
- Andre Paras, Filipino actor and son of Benjie Paras
- Benjie Paras, Filipino actor and former professional basketball player
- Paras Khadka (born 1987), Nepalese cricketer
- Kobe Paras (born 1997), Filipino basketball player and son of Benjie Paras

== Places ==
- Paras District, one of six districts of the province Cangallo in Peru
- Parás, Nuevo León, a town in Northern Mexico.

== Other uses ==
- Paras (1949 film), an Indian romantic drama film
- Paras (1971 film), an Indian Hindi-language film
- Paras (serial), a 2015 Pakistani drama serial produced by A & B Entertainment
- PRL Advanced Radial-velocity All-sky Search, an astronomy project
- Paratroopers
  - Parachute Regiment (United Kingdom), a unit in the British Army, known as "the Paras"
- Paras pathar, the name for philosopher's stone in India
- Parash Pathar, 1958 Indian film
- Parash Pathar (band), Indian band
- Parasmani, 1963 Indian film
- Paras Gavaskar, Marvel Comics character also known as Indra
- Paras (Pokémon)
- The Paras, 1983 BBC TV documentary series

== See also ==
- Para (disambiguation)
