= Grand-Béréby =

- Town, sub-prefecture, and commune
- Location in Ivory Coast
- Coordinates: 4°39′N 6°56′W
- Country: Ivory Coast
- District: Bas-Sassandra
- Region: San-Pédro
- Department: San-Pédro

Population (2014)
  - Total: 98,686
- Time zone: UTC+0 (GMT)

Grand-Béréby is a coastal town in south-western Ivory Coast. It is a sub-prefecture and commune of San-Pédro Department in San-Pédro Region, Bas-Sassandra District.

Grand-Béréby is located where the Néro river enters the Atlantic. A 1,010 metres (3,314 ft) unpaved airstrip serves the town.

== Tourism ==
The city is equipped with a resort, the La Baie des sirènes, the Ecolodge Le Kara Krou chez Gus, à Ménéké plage. 9 km to Grand Béréby of easy track, overlooking the ocean and in the middle of nature is the Ecolodge Le Kara Krou, on the beach of Ménéké (Dahoua).

The village of Boubélé, located 60 km to the west, in the direction of Tabou is specialized in sport fishing. Red carp, barracuda, mackerel, trevallies, skate, marlin and sharks abound in this area.

== Notable people ==
- Jean Michaël Seri (born 19 July 1991), is an Ivorian international footballer

In 2014, the population of the sub-prefecture of Grand-Béréby was 98,686.

== Villages ==
The seventy four villages of the sub-prefecture of Grand-Béréby and their population in 2014 were:

1. Badiké (799)
2. Dawa (245)
3. Djikla (385)
4. Dosso (395)
5. Gboro (694)
6. Grand-Béréby (9 338)
7. Grand-Djourou (830)
8. Hannié (710)
9. Ménéké (378)
10. Ménolé (1 531)
11. Néro-Boupé (135)
12. Néro-Mer (255)
13. Nouhou Youkou (128)
14. Ouro (262)
15. Roc-Dougbalé (363)
16. Roc-Oulidié (839)
17. Takoro (580)
18. Youwasso (1 785)
19. Adjaméné (10 521)
20. Baco 1 (705)
21. Baco 2 (529)
22. Baco 3 (805)
23. Batcha (488)
24. Bébé (150)
25. Djihimbo (889)
26. Dolé I (628)
27. Dolé Il (890)
28. Dolé Ill (430)
29. Dotou (3 112)
30. Gliké 1 (2 277)
31. Gliké 2 (908)
32. Gnaoula (497)
33. Grand-Djoro (481)
34. Gréléon (3 178)
35. Héké 1 (841)
36. Héké 2 (833)
37. Héké 3 (722)
38. Héké-Village (3 512)
39. Iboké (1 737)
40. Iratéké (2 556)
41. Irépoué (53)
42. Kablaké (479)
43. Kako 1 (827)
44. Kako 2 (620)
45. Kako 3 (472)
46. Kako-Village (6 704)
47. Klana (229)
48. Klotou (501)
49. Koto I (727)
50. Koto Il (628)
51. Koto Ill (784)
52. Mani-Béréby (827)
53. Nané (732)
54. Néhonnié 1 (720)
55. Néhonnié 2 (277)
56. Néro-Brousse (2 532)
57. Ouatéké (266)
58. Ouéléké (1 180)
59. Ouéoulo (1 741)
60. Ouesséké (114)
61. Oulibio (75)
62. Oulidié (794)
63. Oulisso (112)
64. Pataké (702)
65. Petit-Nado (966)
66. Pitiké (255)
67. Pont-Néro (2 749)
68. Singhé I (506)
69. Singhé Il (1342)
70. Singhé Ill (893)
71. Sogb (5 164)
72. Tékoulébo (111)
73. Trahé (8 043)
74. Waté (320)
