= Ivory Coast–Liberia border =

International border

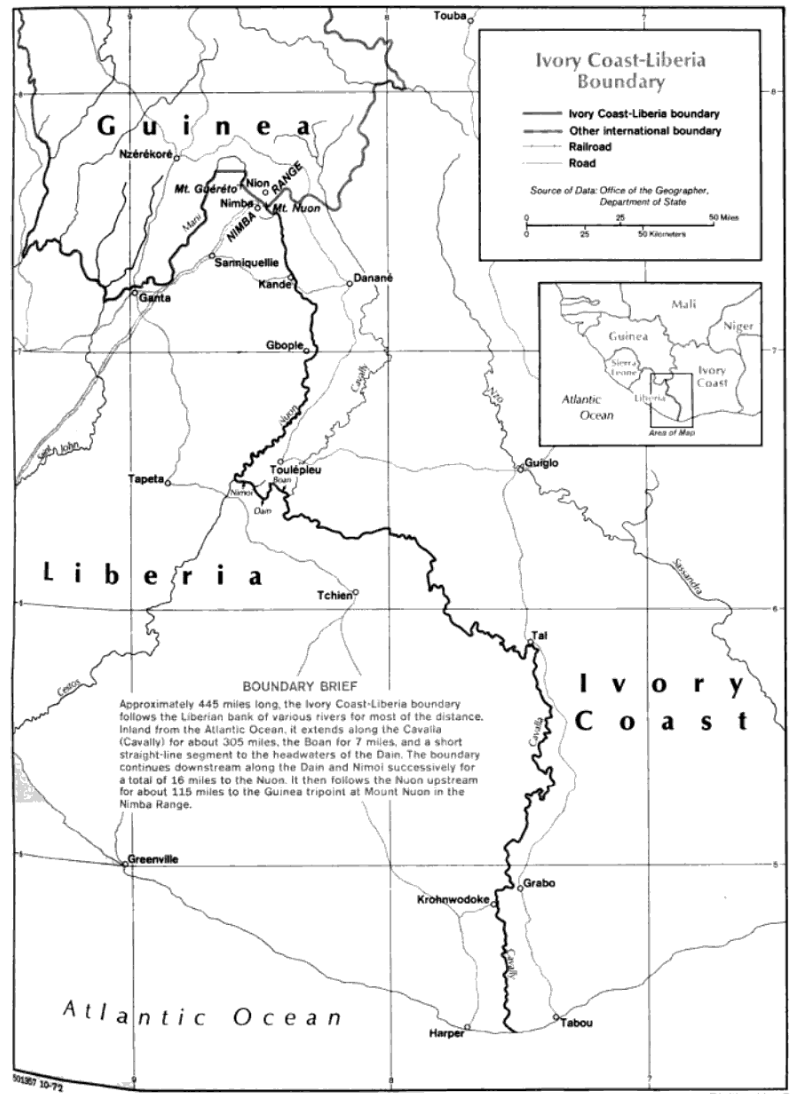
Map of the Ivory Coast–Liberia border

The Ivory Coast–Liberia border is 778 km (483 mi) in length and runs from the tripoint with Guinea in the north down to the Atlantic Ocean in the south. It separates the Liberian counties of Grand Gedeh, River Gee, Maryland and Nimba from the Ivorian districts of Montagnes and Bas-Sassandra.

== Description ==
The border starts in the north on Mount Nuon in the Nimba Range, and after a very short overland sections reaches the Nuon river, which it follows southwards. It then briefly follows the Dain, Nimoi and Boan rivers, before reaching the Cavalla, which it follows in a broad right angled course out to the Atlantic. It ends 21 km east of the southernmost point of West Africa, Cape Palmas.

== History ==
Liberia was founded as a colony for freed American slaves in 1822; various settlements were founded along the coast in the following years, with the bulk of them uniting to create the Republic of Liberia in 1847 (the Republic of Maryland joined later in 1857). France had also taken an interest in the West African coast, establishing a protectorates along the modern Ivorian coast in the 1840s, which later becoming the colony of Ivory Coast in 1893. In order to establish ownership over the interior, France and Liberia signed a treaty on 8 December 1892 outlining a boundary between Liberian and French territory (both Ivory Coast and French Guinea). This utilised the Cavalla river and series of straight lines, however the difficulties with demarcating this boundary on the ground led France and Liberia to conclude another treaty on 18 September 1907 (confirmed in January 1911) which moved it southwards to its current position. Part of the northern section of the boundary was later demarcated on the ground from 1926 to 1929.

Ivory Coast gained independence in 1960, and the boundary then became one between two sovereign states. The two states confirmed in 1961 that they would respect the existing frontier. The border became very unstable in the 1990s-2000s due to a series of civil wars in the region. United Nations troops have been monitoring sections of the border.

== Settlements near the border ==
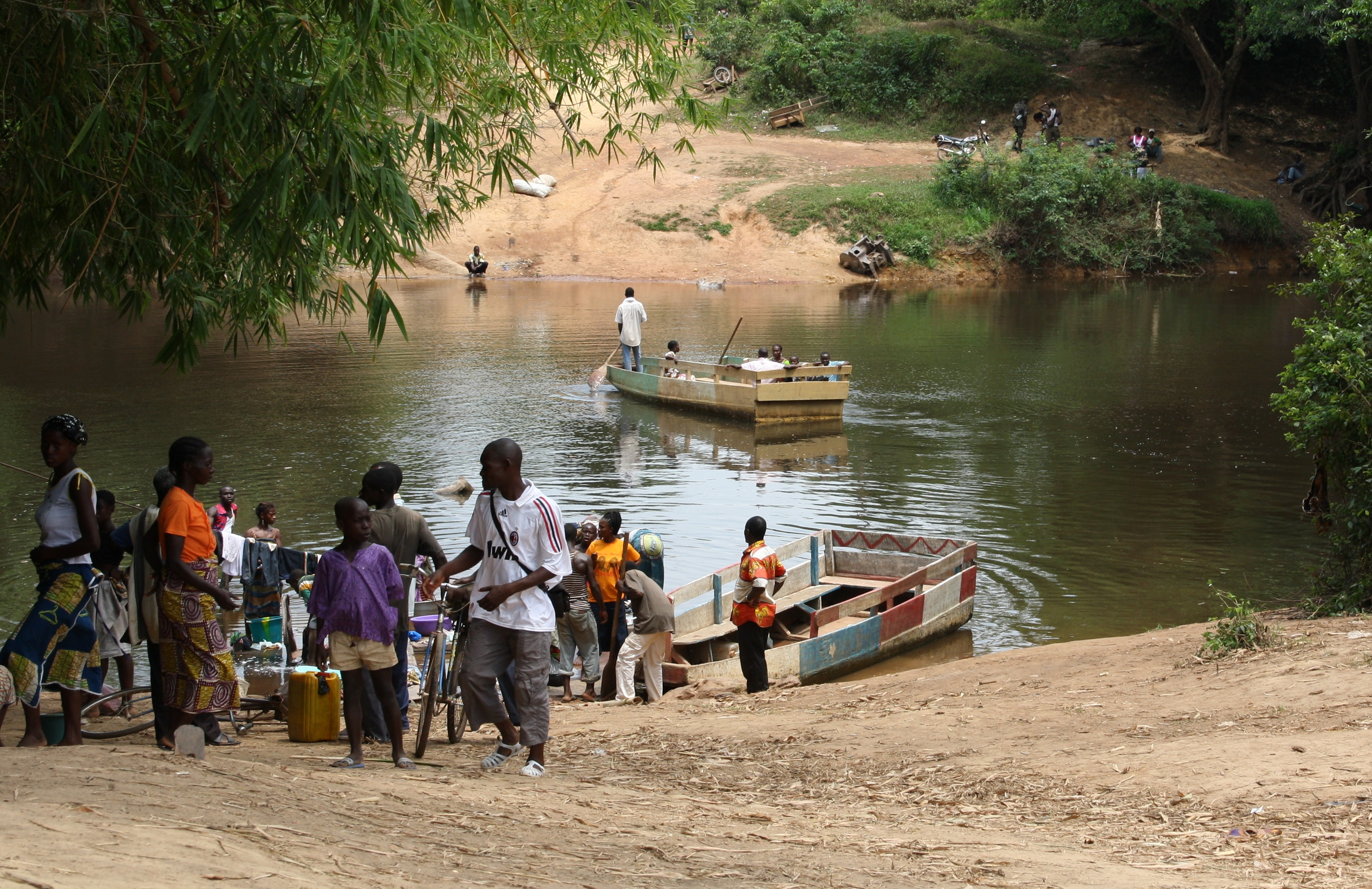
Refugees crossing the border during the Ivorian Civil War in 2011

=== Ivory Coast ===
- Toulépleu
- Taï
- Grabo

> Gbainta > Gaoplue >Sallue >Blehplue >Guotuo

=== Liberia ===
- Gbople
- Butlo
- Kpeaple
- Yopie Podogle
- Tliapie
- Tobli
- Towabli
- Kola
- Balike
- Drubo
- Galio
- Tawrokehn
- Yibuke
- Nemeke
- Kedeke
