= Dapo-Iboké =

Town and sub-prefecture in Ivory Coast

- Town and sub-prefecture
- Location in Ivory Coast
- Coordinates: 4°44′N 7°24′W
- Country: Ivory Coast
- District: Bas-Sassandra
- Region: San-Pédro
- Department: Tabou

Population (2014)
  - Total: 14,858
- Time zone: UTC+0 (GMT)

Dapo-Iboké is a town in south-western Ivory Coast, near the border of Liberia. It is a sub-prefecture of Tabou Department in San-Pédro Region, Bas-Sassandra District.

Dapo-Iboké was a commune until March 2012, when it became one of 1,126 communes nationwide that were abolished.

In 2014, the population of the sub-prefecture of Dapo-Iboké was 14,858.

== Villages ==
The fifteen villages of the sub-prefecture of Dapo-Iboké and their population in 2014 are:

1. Béoué (161)
2. Dapo-Iboké (1,499)
3. Déhoulinké (1,088)
4. Djouloké (149)
5. Gbaroké (720)
6. Gnénaholoké (875)
7. Gblétoké (88)
8. Hyrré (604)
9. Iboké V1 (1,659)
10. Iboké V2 (2,471)
11. Iboké V3 (1,214)
12. Mané (2,705)
13. Niplou (1,049)
14. Pataké (254)
15. Tatou (322)
