= Doba, Ivory Coast =

Doba
- Town and sub-prefecture
- Location in Ivory Coast
- Coordinates: 5.20054°N 6.83096°W
- Country: Ivory Coast
- District: Bas-Sassandra
- Region: San-Pédro
- Department: San-Pédro

Area
  - Total: 2,010 km^{2} (780 sq mi)

Population (2021 census)
  - Total: 95,246
  - Density: 47.4/km^{2} (123/sq mi)
  - Town: 13,517
- (2014 census)
- Time zone: UTC+0 (GMT)

Doba is a town in south-western Ivory Coast. It is a sub-prefecture of San-Pédro Department in San-Pédro Region, Bas-Sassandra District.

A large northwest portion of the sub-prefecture lies within Taï National Park.

Doba was a commune until March 2012, when it became one of 1,126 communes nationwide that were abolished. In 2021, the population of the sub-prefecture of Doba was 95,246.

== Villages ==
The thirteen villages of the sub-prefecture of Doba and their population in 2014 are:

1. Centre Usine (2,376)
2. Dagadji (21,333)
3. Dahoro (967)
4. Djapadji (30,605)
5. Doba (13,517)
6. Gagny (12,274)
7. Gligbeuadji (24,979)
8. Goh (9,401)
9. Saph V1 (1,034)
10. Saph V2 (1,233)
11. Saph V3 (1,223)
12. Saph V4 (1,952)
13. Saph V5 (2,636)
