= August Stramm =

German war poet and playwright

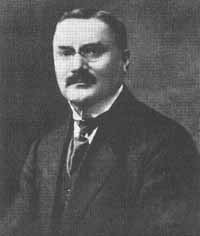
- August Stramm
- Born: July 29, 1874; Münster, Westphalia, Germany
- Died: September 1, 1915 (aged 41); Eastern Front (World War I)
- Occupations: War poet, Playwright

August Stramm (29 July 1874 – 1 September 1915) was a German war poet and playwright who is considered the first of the expressionists. Stramm's radically experimental verse and his major influence on all subsequent German poetry has caused him to be compared to Ezra Pound, Guillaume Apollinaire, James Joyce, and T.S. Eliot. A reserve officer in the Imperial German Army, Stramm was called up to active service at the outbreak of World War I and was killed in action on the Eastern Front.

Jeremy Adler has called August Stramm one of "the most innovative poets of the First World War."

== Life ==
=== Early life ===
August Stramm was born in Münster, Westphalia, in 1874. His father had served in the Prussian Army and had been decorated for bravery during the Franco-Prussian War. According to Patrick Bridgwater, his father's legacy caused the younger Stramm to go through life "with a sense of duty."

Stramm gave "a middling performance at school" and later had to gain his Abitur through part-time study. Against the wishes of his mother, who wanted her son to become a Roman Catholic priest, Stramm joined the German Post Office Ministry in 1893 was rapidly promoted. Between 1896 and 1897, despite being near-sighted, Stramm served his year of compulsory military service in the Imperial German Army.

After being demobilized, Stramm returned to working at the Post Office and was granted a coveted position as a postal worker on luxury ocean liners making the Bremen-Hamburg-New York run. This led to Stramm making several long stays in the United States.

After returning from America, Stramm married the romance novelist Else Kraft, with whom he had two children, in 1902. They lived in Bremen until 1905, when they settled in Berlin.

=== First of the Expressionists ===
According to Bridgwater, "His early work (romantic poetry, painting rather ordinary landscapes, still-lifes, a naturalistic play) was basically unoriginal and derivative."

Stramm's daughter Inge later wrote that, "around the year 1912, literature overtook him like a sickness... A Demon awoke in him."

Stramm began writing plays and poems "in a strange new style that could find no publisher."

According to Jeremy Adler, "Stramm's plays, too, became concentrated and brief, distilling situations into a few characteristics and increasingly ambiguous words and gestures. Characters are types like 'He' and 'She', and the surroundings merge into action: sound, word, gesture, and decor blend into a symbolic whole. The first mature plays are complementary opposites: the Symbolistic Sancta Susanna (1912-13)," portrays a Roman Catholic nun who violates her vow of chastity, "while the Naturalistic Rudimentär (1912-14) shows the glimmerings of reason awakening in a Berlin semi-literate."

Stramm, however, was soon, "driven to near despair by his lack of success as a writer." By 1913, he was on the verge of destroying all his manuscripts when Else Stramm, whose novels had had no such troubles with publication, urged her husband to contact Herwarth Walden, the editor of the avant-garde magazine Der Sturm.

According to Jeremy Adler, Herwarth Walden, "stood at the forefront of the avante-garde movement in Berlin." He was receiving submissions from countless international artists, including Oskar Kokoschka, Pablo Picasso, Franz Marc, and Wassily Kandinsky. Walden was also in contact with Italian Futurist poet Filippo Tommaso Marinetti and with French poet Guillaume Apollinaire. In Der Sturm, Walden had published German translations of Marinetti's Manifesto of Futurism and Apollinaire's Modern Painting.

According to Adler, "For Walden, Cubism, Futurism, and Expressionism were essentially the same, and he sought to unite them in his own all-embracing Sturm-Kunst." What Walden had lacked, however, before August Stramm contacted him in 1914, was a German poet "whose work could stand comparison with the international elite who figured in Der Sturm."

From the time of their first meeting, a close friendship developed between Walden and Stramm. Personally and artistically, "they became indispensable to each other and it can be inferred that Stramm's style now became fully mature through Walden's encouragement. In the next sixteen months, Stramm produced the sixty two shorter poems on which his reputation mainly rests. During this period, hardly an issue of Der Sturm appeared that did not contain a play by Stramm or a group of his poems."

=== War service ===
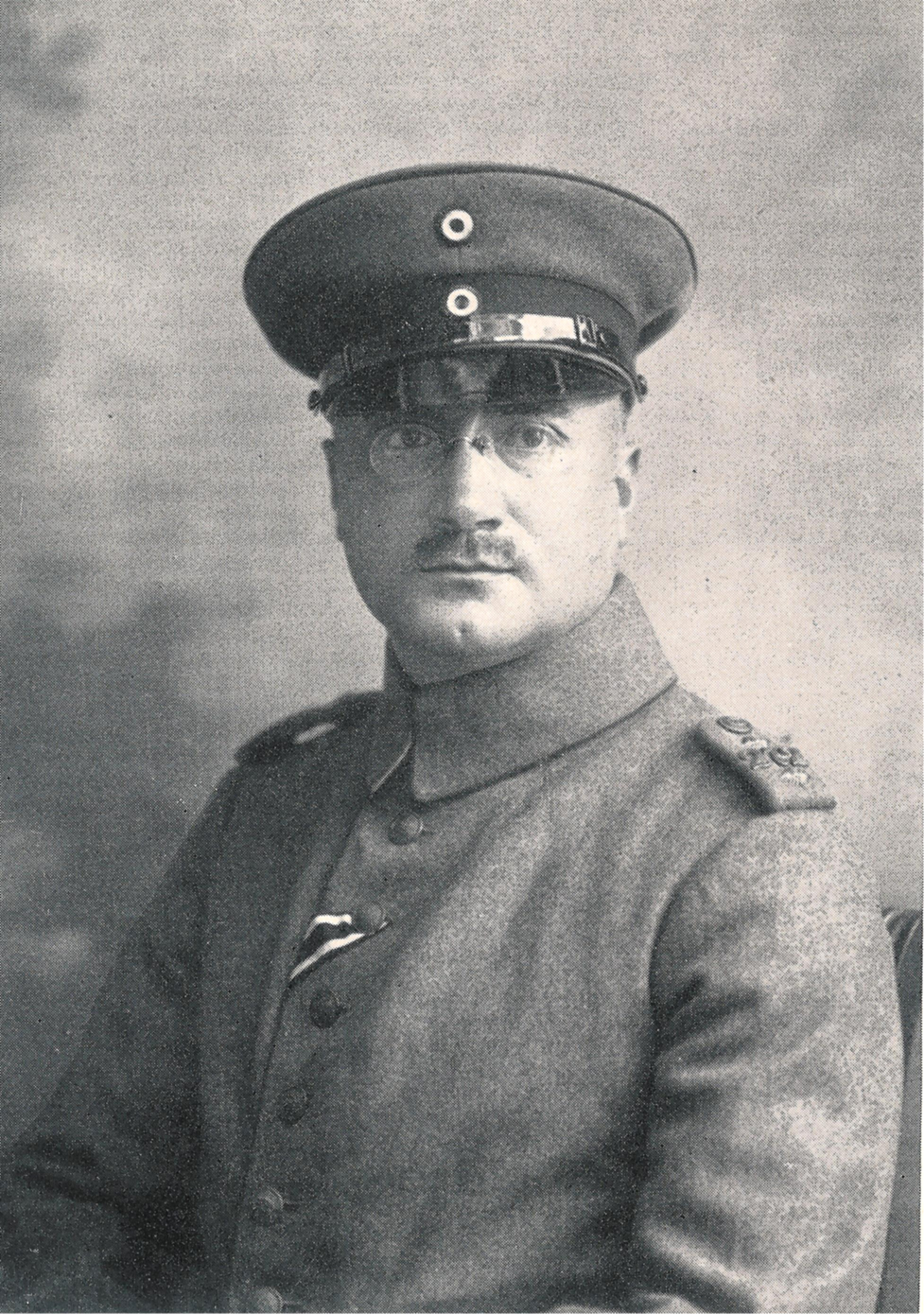
Captain August Stramm, c.1915

Stramm was a reserve officer in the Prussian Army. By 1914 he had reached the rank of captain.

Upon the outbreak of World War I in 1914, Stramm "was called up immediately" and was, "posted as a company commander to Landwehrregiment 110, with which he saw action on the Western Front, in the Vosges, and in Alsace."

According to Jeremy Adler, "From the start, Stramm had few illusions and never joined in the so-called Hurrah-Patriotismus."

In mid-January 1915, Stramm was reassigned, again as a company commander, to the newly formed Reserve Infantry Regiment 272, which was stationed at Oise, near the Somme River in northern France. By the end of the month, Stramm had been awarded the Iron Cross (Second Class) for courage under fire.

In a letter on February 14, 1915, Stramm wrote, "But there is horror in me, there is horror around me, bubbling, surging around, throttling, ensnaring. There's no way out anymore."

On February 23, 1915, he wrote, "Germany needs brave soldiers. Nothing else will do. We have to go through with it, however much we condemn the war."

According to Patrick Bridgwater, "While Stramm is known to have enjoyed his peacetime role of reserve officer, he was too sensitive to have any illusions about the war, which he hated (for all the unholy fascination it held for him). On 12 January 1915 he wrote to Walden from the Western Front, 'I stand like a cramp, unsteady, without a foundation, without a brace, anchored, and numb in the grimace of my will and stubbornness,' and a few months later he wrote to his wife from Galicia that everything was so dreadful, so unspeakably dreadful. Thus while he was always absolutely sure where his duty lay, he did not write a single chauvinistic war poem even at the time when nearly everybody else in Germany - or so it seemed - was doing so. Nor did he write overtly anti-war poems, which his conscience would not have allowed him to do. In retrospect it seems extraordinary that the poem Feuertaufe ("Baptism by Fire") should have caused a scandal in the German press in 1915, for its only conceivable fault is its utter honesty, its attempt to convey the feeling of coming under enemy fire for the first time and its implicit refusal to pretend that the feeling in question was one of heroic excitement."

According to Jeremy Adler, "Although the letters testify to profound inner turmoil, Stramm was a popular officer and a brave soldier."

At the end of April 1915, Stramm's regiment was transferred to the Eastern Front, in order to serve under the command of General August von Mackensen in the Gorlice–Tarnów Offensive against the Russian-occupied Austro-Hungarian Crownland of Galicia.

According to Patrick Bridgwater, "Stramm distinguished himself and was at one point acting Battalion Commander, in which role he was involved in the attack on the Russian positions at Ostrow. It was here that he won the Austrian Kriegsverdienstkreuz and was recommended for the Iron Cross (First Class)."

After the recapture of Przemysl and Lviv, Stramm and his regiment continued to pursue the Imperial Russian Army during the Great Retreat of 1915. By July, Stramm's regiment had reached the Bug River.

At the beginning of August 1915, Stramm was sent home on what was his final furlough. His daughter Inge, who adored her father, later recalled how Stramm made her ten-year-old brother promise, "never to let himself down," by being, "a Schweinhund before himself."

His family later learned that throughout his furlough, Stramm had carried a letter in his pocket which he needed only to countersign in order to be released from all future military service at his publisher's request. By this time, Stramm had come to detest the war and believed that his death in combat was imminent. His mind was also filled with projects that he longed to write down. In the end, however, Stramm was, according to Patrick Bridgwater, "unable to accept the alibi of a higher duty to literature," and left the letter unsigned.

After returning to his company following a week's journey, Stramm found that they had been reduced to only 25 men. It was the time of a Russian counteroffensive led by General Aleksei Brusilov. Stramm, with the remnants of his company, was involved in "the giant-battle for Brest-Litovsk", which fell to Stramm's regiment on August 25, 1915.

== Death ==
On September 1, 1915, August Stramm led an attack against the Imperial Russian Army in the Rokitno Marshes. The attack degenerated into brutal hand-to-hand combat and Stramm, who had been in action 70 times in all, was shot in the head by a Russian soldier. He was the last member of his company to fall during the attack.

According to Jeremy Adler, Stramm was about to be awarded the Iron Cross (First Class) at the time of his death.

According to Patrick Bridgwater, "What is quite extraordinary is that he appears to have found in the hell-on-earth of total warfare around Brest-Litovsk in 1915 the sense of harmony he had sought for so long."

A few weeks before his death, Stramm had written to Herwarth Walden, "Singularly, life and death are one... Both are one... Battle and the night and death and the nightingale are all one. One! And fighting and sleeping and dreaming and acting are all one! There is no separation! All goes together and swims and shimmers like sun and whirlpool. Only time goes forward, time this. So do fighting, hungering, singing, dying. All! Soldier and officer! Day and night! Sorrowing and bleeding! And a hand shines over me! I swim through everything. Am everything! I!".

A blood-stained copy of the 1904 German translation of the book "In Tune with the Infinite" (In Harmonie mit dem Unendlichen), by American New Thought philosopher Ralph Waldo Trine, was found in Stramm's pocket after his death. Stramm's enthusiasm for Trine is believed to have been a legacy of the time he spent living in the United States.

August Stramm's body was buried with full military honors at Gorodets, in the Kobryn District of modern Belarus, on October 2, 1915.

Captain Stramm and his son Helmuth both lie buried at the Stahnsdorf South-Western Cemetery, near the Berlin suburb of the same name.

== Literary career ==
Jeremy Adler has written that August Stramm was, "along with Guillaume Apollinaire, among the most innovative poets of the First World War." Stramm, Adler writes, treated, "language like a physical material" and, "honed down syntax to its bare essentials." Citing Stramm's fondness for "fashioning new words out of old," Adler has also written that, "what James Joyce did on a grand scale for English, Stramm achieved more modestly for German."

Between April 1914 and the outbreak of the Great War, Stramm wrote the poems contained in his first collection, which was titled Du. Liebesgedichte (You. Love Poems"). According to Jeremy Adler, the poems contained in Du explore, "the changing and often tense relationship between the poet's self Ich (I), and an often undefined Du (You). This Du, more than a single woman, is extended to include womankind, humanity, and God. This the 'love' recorded ranges from debased sexuality in Freudenhaus ("House of Pleasures") to the love of God in Allmacht ("Almighty"). Love is seen as essentially ambiguous; or, rather, it cannot be separated from, and always involves its own opposite, strife. Appropriately, the collection begins with a poem that announces this duality: Liebeskampf (Love-Fight")." Du. Liebesgedichte was published whilst Stramm was at the front in 1915.

Stramm's war poetry was published in Der Sturm during his lifetime and later appeared in the collection Tropfenblut ("Dripping Blood"), which was posthumously published in 1919.

According to Patrick Bridgwater, "Stramm's war poems are concerned with particulars, with the brute realities, the basic experiences of life at the front."

According to Jeremy Adler, "Like no others in German, Stramm's war poems give an immediate impression of the front. By eschewing a self-conscious persona, and treating the poem itself as a reality, Stramm thrusts intense images of the war directly before the reader. Exploiting all his newly perfected techniques, he precisely conveys the exact moments, the various horrors of war: the terror of being under fire in Im Feuer, shelling in Granaten, hesitation in Zagen, the difficult advance in Signal, combat in Haidekampf, or single combat in Urtod ("Primal Death"). But there are also rare moments of beauty, as in the evening atmosphere of Abend, when the poet glimpses a higher being, the distant Du."

== Legacy ==
Adler has also written that August Stramm's "essential innovation (still too little recognized in Germany) was to create a new, non-representational kind of poetry," which is, "comparable," to Pablo Picasso's creation of abstract art and to Arnold Schönberg's revolution in the writing of Classical music.

In his 1985 book, The German Poets of the First World War, Patrick Bridgwater dubbed the literary movement inspired by Stramm's poetry, "the German variety of Imagism."

Shortly before the outbreak of war in 1914, T.E. Hulme heard the kind of poetry that Stramm created and inspired being read aloud at the Cabaret Gnu in Berlin. Hulme later wrote, "Very short sentences are used, sometimes so terse and elliptical as to produce a blunt and jerky effect ... It is clear that a definite attempt is being made to use the language in a new way, an attempt to cure it of certain vices."

Even though, according to Jeremy Adler, "Stramm's rigorous, demanding style," never gained him the popular appeal of Georg Trakl, Stramm, "has had a significant influence on German poetry." First his verse was a model for the poets of the Sturm-Kreis ("Sturm-Circle") which included Kurt Heynicke, Otto Nebel, and Franz Behrens. Then, Dadaism and Kurt Schwitters took Stramm as their starting point. After the Second World War, Stramm's poetry inspired experimental writers like Gerhard Rühm and Paul Celan. Writing in 1988, Adler commented that, "several younger writers openly acknowledge," that they have been influenced by August Stramm and that his, "place as a modern classic seems to be assured."

In 1921, Paul Hindemith, a German composer of Classical music and fellow veteran of the Great War, turned Stramm's play Sancta Susanna, about a nun who breaks her vow of chastity, into an opera with the same name. The premiere, however, was not without controversy among members of the Roman Catholic Church in Germany, to whom the subject matter was understandingly very offensive.

English translations of poems by Stramm were published by Patrick Bridgwater (August Stramm, 22 Poems, 1969) and Jeremy Adler (Tim Cross, The Lost Voices of World War I, 1988).

== See also ==
- War poet
