= Tabu =

Tabu may refer to:

== Cultural and legal concepts ==
- Taboo (spelled tabu in earlier historical records), something that is unacceptable in society
- Tapu (Polynesian culture) (also spelled tabu), a Polynesian cultural concept from which the word taboo derives
- Tapu (Ottoman law) (also tabu), a permanent lease of state-owned arable land to a peasant family in the Ottoman Empire
- Toubou people of Africa

== People ==
- Tabu (actress) (born 1971), Indian actress
- Tabu Ley Rochereau (1937–2013), Congolese musician
- Tabu Taid (born 1942), Indian educationist, writer and scholar
- Tabu Abdallah, Burundian politician and former finance minister for Burundi

== Film and television ==
- Tabu (1931 film), a 1931 film
- Tabu (2012 film), a 2012 Portuguese film
- Tabu (TV series), a Finnish dark comedic show
- Tabu the Jungle Wizard, a superpowered jungle hero comic book character created by Fletcher Hanks

== Music ==
- Tabu, a 2017 album by Timoteij
- Tabu, a 2017 album by Lana Jurčević
- Tabu, a 2018 album by Michelle
- "Tabú" (song), a 2019 song by Pablo Alborán and Ava Max
- Tabu Records, an American record label founded in 1975
- Tabu Records (Denmark), founded by the Danish group Suspekt in 1998
- Tabu Recordings, an independent Norwegian record label founded in 2003

== Other uses ==
- Tabu search, a mathematical optimization method
- Tabu by Dana, a perfume and cosmetics line from the 1930s manufactured by House of Dana
- Tabù, a liquorice candy produced and distributed by Perfetti Van Melle

== See also ==
- Taboo (disambiguation)
- Tabuu, a character from the video game Super Smash Bros. Brawl
- Tabou (disambiguation)
