= Grabo, Ivory Coast =

Grabo
- Town, sub-prefecture, and commune
- Location in Ivory Coast
- Coordinates: 4°55′N 7°30′W
- Country: Ivory Coast
- District: Bas-Sassandra
- Region: San-Pédro
- Department: Tabou

Population (2014)
  - Total: 39,181
- Time zone: UTC+0 (GMT)

Grabo is a town in south-western Ivory Coast. It is a sub-prefecture and commune of Tabou Department in San-Pédro Region, Bas-Sassandra District. The town is three kilometres east of the Cavally River, which forms the border with Liberia.

In 2014, the population of the sub-prefecture of Grabo was 39,181.

== Villages ==
The nineteen villages of the sub-prefecture of Grabo and their population in 2014 are:

1. Déblablai (1 080)
2. Djimané (103)
3. Dougbo (317)
4. Fêtè (518)
5. Gbapet (2 729)
6. Grabo (8 980)
7. Négbatchi (6 139)
8. Nouin (349)
9. Siahé (1 618)
10. Gbahiro (748)
11. Gnato (12 803)
12. Guikla (119)
13. Ouesséto (163)
14. Podoué (1 295)
15. Sioulo (324)
16. Soklodogba (501)
17. Soto (950)
18. Tiboto (221)
19. Woté (224)
