= The Flight from the Enchanter =

Book by Iris Murdoch

- Cover of the first edition
- Author: Iris Murdoch
- Cover artist: Edward Bawden
- Language: English
- Publisher: Chatto & Windus
- Publication date: 1956
- Publication place: United Kingdom
- Media type: Print (Hardcover and Paperback)
- Pages: 287 (paperback edition)

The Flight from the Enchanter is a 1956 novel by Iris Murdoch.

== Plot summary ==
The novel is a tale of a group of people caught by the spell of the mysterious and enigmatic Mischa Fox - the enchanter - possibly foreign, definitely wealthy, and said to have great, perhaps mystical powers. Peter Saward, a scholar, is in love with Rosa Keepe. Ten years previously, Rosa refused Fox's marriage proposal, and is currently engaged in an affair with two Polish immigrants, the Lusciewicz brothers. Rosa's brother, Hunter, edits a suffragette magazine. The fearsome Calvin Blick, Fox's despised agent, is attempting to buy the magazine for Fox, and performs other machinations. The adventurous, willful Annette Cockeyne, age 19, drops out of school to learn from real life, but gets in over her head, especially after she becomes a target of Fox's attention. John Rainborough, a bureaucrat, suffers from unrequited love and threats to his authority from his "typist," Miss Casement. Nina the dressmaker clothes both Annette and Rosa, and is meanwhile one of Fox's agents, or perhaps his slave.

== Contemporary themes ==
Set mainly against the background of post-WWII West London, issues of immigration and women's liberation recur throughout the story. Through his connection to Rainborough, Hunter Keepe accesses classified information on immigration policy to use against Stefan Lusiewicz, who he wants out of his house. Another Eastern European, Nina, kills herself after discovering she might be deported. Annette, smitten with a seemingly uncaring Fox, attempts suicide in a London hotel room. A group of elderly Suffragettes inject humour into the story. Although apparently preposterous, they hold high moral principles and show more decisiveness than anyone.

== Principal characters ==
- Mischa Fox
- Rosa Keepe
- Hunter Keepe
- Annette Cockeyne
- Peter Saward
- John Rainborough
- Calvin Blick
