= Djouroutou =

Town and sub-prefecture in Ivory Coast

- Town and sub-prefecture
- Location in Ivory Coast
- Coordinates: 5°22′N 7°17′W
- Country: Ivory Coast
- District: Bas-Sassandra
- Region: San-Pédro
- Department: Tabou

Population (2014)
  - Total: 71,651
- Time zone: UTC+0 (GMT)

Djouroutou is a town in south-western Ivory Coast. It is a sub-prefecture of Tabou Department in San-Pédro Region, Bas-Sassandra District. The town is 11 kilometres east of the border with Liberia.

A large portion of the north-eastern area of the sub-prefecture lies within Taï National Park.

Djouroutou was a commune until March 2012, when it became one of 1,126 communes nationwide that were abolished.

In 2014, the population of the sub-prefecture of Djouroutou was 71,651.

== Villages ==
The seventeen villages of the sub-prefecture of Djouroutou and their population in 2014 are:

1. Béoué (3,432)
2. Béréblo (4,281)
3. Diaoudi (202)
4. Djéka/Petit Guiglo (1,562)
5. Djouroutou (3,840)
6. Gbarou (937)
7. Gbéléto (702)
8. Hannié (7,989)
9. Karié (5,718)
10. Mahino 1 (2,681)
11. Mahino 2 (1,819)
12. Néka-Village (1,861)
13. Nigré (2,142)
14. Para (17,594)
15. Petit-Grabo (12,385)
16. Poutou (2,985)
17. Youkou (1,521)
