= Gabiadji =

- Town and sub-prefecture
- Location in Ivory Coast
- Coordinates: 5°1′N 6°34′W
- Country: Ivory Coast
- District: Bas-Sassandra
- Region: San-Pédro
- Department: San-Pédro

Area
  - Total: 1,160 km^{2} (450 sq mi)

Population (2021 census)
  - Total: 113,389
  - Density: 97.7/km^{2} (253/sq mi)
  - Town: 17,449
- (2014 census)
- Time zone: UTC+0 (GMT)

Gabiadji is a town in south-western Ivory Coast. It is a sub-prefecture of San-Pédro Department in San-Pédro Region, Bas-Sassandra District.

Gabiadji was a commune until March 2012, when it became one of 1,126 communes nationwide that were abolished.

In 2021, the population of the sub-prefecture of Gabiadji was 113,389.

== Villages ==
The twenty five villages of the sub-prefecture of Gabiadji and their population in 2014 are:

1. Bida (3,255)
2. Blahou (7,729)
3. Boignikro (2,762)
4. Brazzaville (2,831)
5. Do-Sakassou (3,914)
6. Fahé (3,227)
7. Gabiadji (17,449)
8. Gbapoutou (2,274)
9. Gnamkeykro (1,938)
10. Gnanké (4,726)
11. Gnity Cailloux (4,153)
12. Gnity Ecole (4,301)
13. Grand-Domaine (1,837)
14. Grobonou-Dan (5,214)
15. Houphouet-Kouadiokro (703)
16. Kpakobo (6,651)
17. Marie-Chantier (3,096)
18. Méné-Centre (1,652)
19. Menegbé (1,719)
20. Naboville (1,401)
21. Nonouan (5,132)
22. Scaf (3,590)
23. Soumahorodougou (3,085)
24. Touih (15,958)
25. Touredougou (1,336)
