= Taboo (drink) =

Fruit-flavoured spirit

- Type: Spirit
- Manufacturer: First Drink
- Origin: United Kingdom
- Introduced: 1988
- Alcohol by volume: 14.9%
- Proof (US): 29.8
- Flavour: Fruit

Taboo is a fruit-flavoured spirit made in the UK. Its main ingredients are vodka, white wine and peach and tropical fruit juices. Its alcohol content is 14.9% (29.8 proof).

Taboo was first put out on the market in 1988 by drinks company First Drink. However, after an initial honeymoon period for the product up until the early 1990s, the company spent very little money on promoting it; in 2005 only £8,000 was spent. In 2006 First Drink hired 23red to boost Taboo's profile.

Originally the drink was marketed with a companion spirit called Mirage, with advertising showing both products.
