= Jeremy Adler =

British Poet

Jeremy Adler is a British scholar and poet, and emeritus professor and senior research fellow at King's College London. As a poet he is known especially for his concrete poetry and artist's books. As an academic he is known for his work on German literature specialising in the Age of Goethe, Romanticism, Expressionism and Modernism with contributions on figures such as Goethe, Hölderlin, and Kafka.

== Early life and education ==
He was born in London in 1947, the son of artist Bettina Adler, and poet and Holocaust survivor H. G. Adler, and was educated at St Marylebone Grammar School (1958–1966) and Queen Mary College London (1966–1969), where he graduated with a first class degree in German with English. He studied for a PhD at Westfield College London, obtaining his degree in 1978 with a thesis on the chemistry of German polymath Johann Wolfgang Goethe's Elective Affinities under Claus Bock.

== Career ==
He was a lecturer in German at Westfield College London (1974–1991) and was awarded a personal chair at Queen Mary and Westfield College London (1991–1994). He was professor of German and head of department at King’s College London (1994–2004), Deputy Head and then Associate Head of the School of Humanities at King's College London in 2002-2004. He was also on the Senate of the University of London from 2000-2004.

He was a council member of the Poetry Society (1973–1977) and a member of the Bielefeld Colloquium für neue Poesie (1979–2003). He was awarded the Goethe Prize of the English Goethe Society (1977) and a Stipend of the Herzog August Bibliothek, Wolfenbüttel (1979, 1985, 1990). He was a joint honorary secretary of the English Goethe Society (1986–2004) and has been a member of the council of the English Goethe Society since 1973. He was also a council member of the International Goethe Society (1995–2003). For ten years he was founding chairman of the Marie-Louise von Motesiczky Charitable Trust (1996–2006). He was a fellow at the Institute of Advanced Study, Berlin (1985–1986; 2012). Since 1989 he was a member of the Austrian PEN-Club. In 2005 he was elected a corresponding member of the German Academy of Language and Literature. He is a member of the Academic Council of the Freies Deutsches Hochstift and of the Triglav Circle. His English biography of Goethe was voted the best book on Goethe in The Five Books by David Wellbery (2024) and the expanded German edition was voted book of the month by Die Welt'. His edition of David Rousset's memoir on The Concentrationary Universe was voted a 'Spiegel bestseller. He has also been engaged politically, e.g. reporting on Czechoslovakia's Velvet Revolution in 1989, or in his critique of the new edition of Mein Kampf in the Süddeutsche Zeitung in 2016 and the Open Letter he organised to the European Heads of State, also in 2016. He has written widely on Brexit and the future of Europe in the German-speaking press publishing in Süddeutsche Zeitung, Frankfurter Allgemeine Zeitung, Die Welt and Neue Zürcher Zeitung. Two editions of his Voices from Ukraine were published online in the journal Central Europe in 2022.

As a poet, he has been active on the literary scene since the 1960s, initially writing experimental poetry in the circle connected with the Poetry Society. He published alongside experimentalists like Bob Cobbing, Cris Cheek, Lawrence Upton and Bill Griffiths, bringing out over a dozen poetry books and pamphlets. He has been represented in numerous exhibitions, such as Sprachen jenseits von Dichtung (1979), [The Open and Closed Book] at the Victoria and Albert Museum and [Vom Aussehen der Woerter] at the Kunstmuseum Hannover, and in anthologies such as Typewriter Art (2014) and A Human Document (2014). This side of his work – poetry, drawings, artists' books – is represented in many major collections including the Victoria and Albert Museum (London), the Herzog August Bibliothek (Wolfenbüttel), the New York Public Library, the Sackner Archive (Florida), the Getty Museum (Los Angeles), the Special Collection, Maughan Library, King's College London, the Staatsgalerie Stuttgart, the Department of Prints and Drawings, British Museum (London) and Tate Britain. He held a retrospective of his drawings and concrete poems at the National Library of Czechoslovakia, Prague, in 1997. Poems of his have been set to music by Gerhard Lampersberg and Wolfgang Florey. His translations of poems by August Stramm have also been set to music by Michael Nyman in War Works (2014). His novel The Magus of Portobello Road appeared in 2015. His second novel A Night at the Troubadour came out in 2017. His third novel Coriander Bowman's Party was published in 2021.

Since the 1980s he has regularly produced literary journalism, writing for The Times, The Guardian, The Independent, The European and The New York Times as well as for the London Review of Books. He is a regular contributor to the Times Literary Supplement. His work has been translated into French, German, Dutch, Swedish, Russian, Turkish, Italian, Ukrainian, and Japanese.

Adler received an Honorary Silver Medal of Jan Masaryk at the Czech Republic Ambassador's residence in London in November 2019.In 2026 he was awarded a Letter of Récognition by the Zaporhzhzhia National University of Ukraine for services to Ukrainian culture and scholarship. In the same year he was awarded a Letter of Récognition by the Ukrainian Academy of Sciences, which is the highest award the Academy can bestowe.

== Scholarly books, editions, novels, translations ==
- 1979 Ed. (with J.J. White): August Stramm. Kritische Essays und unveröffentliches Quellenmaterial aus dem Nachlass des Dichters.
- 1986 Ed. Allegorie und Eros. Texte von und über Albert Paris Gütersloh.
- 1987 "Eine fast magische Anziehungskraft". Goethes "Wahlverwandtschaften" und die Chemie seiner Zeit.
- 1987 (with Ulrich Ernst): Text als Figur. Visuelle Poesie von der Antike bis zur Moderne, Second, revised edition, 1988. Third edition, 1990.
- 1990 Ed. August Stramm: Die Dichtungen. Sämtliche Gedichte, Dramen. Prosa.
- 1990 Ed. August Stramm: Alles ist Gedicht. Briefe, Gedichte, Bilder.
- 1998 Ed. Friedrich Hölderlin, Selected Poems and Fragments, translated by Michael Hamburger.
- 1998 Ed. H.G. Adler, Der Wahrheit verpflichtet. Interviews, Gedichte, Essays.
- 1999 Ed. (With Richard Fardon) Franz Baermann Steiner: Selected Writings; Volume 1: Taboo, Truth and Religion.
- 1999 Ed. (With Richard Fardon) Franz Baermann Steiner: Selected Writings, Volume 2: Orientalism, Value and Civilization.
- 1999 Ed. H.G. Adler, Eine Reise. Roman.
- 1999 Introduction E.T.A. Hoffmann: The Life and Opinions of the Tomcat Murr.
- 2000 Ed. Franz Baermann Steiner: Am stürzenden Pfad. Gesammelte Gedichte.
- 2000 Ed. (With T.J. Reed and Martin Swales). Goethe at 250. London Symposium / Goethe mit 250. Londoner Symposion.
- 2001 Franz Kafka.
- 2002 Ed. (with Martin Swales and Ann Weaver). Elizabeth M. Wilkinson and L. A. Willoughby, Models of Wholeness. Some Attitudes to Language, Art and Life in the Age of Goethe.
- 2002 (Ed.) H.G. Adler, Eine Reise. Roman.
- 2003 Ed. (with Richard Fardon and Carol Tully) From Prague Poet to Oxford Anthropologist: Franz Baermann Steiner Celebrated. Essays and Translations.
- 2003 Ed.(with Kristian Wachinger) Elias Canetti, Party im Blitz.
- 2005 Ed. H.G. Adler, Theresienstadt 1941–1945. Das Antlitz einer Zwangsgemeinschaft.
- 2005 Ed. Elias Canetti, Party in the Blitz. The English Years.
- 2005 Ed. Elias Canetti, Aufzeichnungen für Marie-Louise.
- 2006 Ed. (With Birgit Sander) Marie-Louise von Motesiczky 1906–1996. The Painter / Die Malerin.
- 2007 Ed. (With Carol Tully) H.G. Adler, Über Franz Baermann Steiner. Brief an Chaim Rabin.
- 2008 Ed. (With Richard Fardon) Franz Baermann Steiner, Zivilisation und Gefahr. Schriften zur Anthropologie, Politik, und Religion.
- 2010 Ed. and translated (with Charlie Louth), Friedrich Hölderlin, Essays and Letters.
- 2011 Ed. (with Katrin Kohl and Franz Hocheneder), H.G. Adler Andere Wege. Gesammelte Gedichte.
- 2012 The Magus of Portobello Road.
- 2013 Ed. (with Peter Filkins) H.G. Adler Nach der Befreiung. Ausgewaehlte Essays zur Geschichte und Soziologie.
- 2014 Ed. (with Peter Filkins) H. G. Adler Orthodoxie des Herzens. Ausgewaehlte Essays zu Literatur, Judentum und Politik.
- 2014 Ed. (with Gesa Dane) Literatur und Anthropologie. H.G. Adler, Elias Canetti und Franz Baermann Steiner in London.
- 2015 Das bittere Brot. H.G.Adler, Elias Canetti und Franz Baermann Steiner im Londoner Exil.
- 2017 Ed. (With Amy Loewenhaar) H.G. Adler. Theresienstadt 1941–1945. The Face of a Coerced Community.
- 2017 Das absolut Boese. Zur Neuedition von 'Mein Kampf'.
- 2017 A Night at the Troubadour.
- 2020 Johann Wolfgang von Goethe
- 2021 A Night at the Troubadour.
- 2022 Ed. David Rousset Das KZ-Universum.
- 2022 With Richard Fardon Franz Baermann Steiner. A Stranger in the World.
- 2022 Goethe. Die Erfindung der Moderne. Eine Biographie.
- 2023 Ed. H. G. Adler After Liberation. Towards a Sociology of the Shoah.
- 2025 From the Renaissance to Modernism. Goethe and Modern German Poetry.
- 2025 The Compass of Dignity. Persecution, Literature, and the Law.
- 2026 Verbo-Visual Worlds.

== Poetry books, pamphlets, artist's books ==
- 1973 Alphabox
- 1974 Alphabet Music
- 1974 Four Sonnets
- 1976 The Amsterdam Quartet
- 1977 Fragments Towards the City
- 1977 Six Triplets
- 1978 Even in April, Ferrara and Liberty
- 1978 The Little Fruitgum Memory Book
- 1979 A Short History of London
- 1979 Triplets. 24 Poems
- 1979 Vowel Jubilee
- 1980 Notes from the Correspondence
- 1980 The Wedding and Other Marriages
- 1980 Triplets. 24 Poems with 6 Etchings by Friedrich Danielis
- 1983 Notes from the Correspondence with etchings by Sylvia Finzi
- 1985 Homage to Theocritus
- 1986 The Electric Alphabet
- 1986 An Alphabet
- 1987 Big Skies and Little Stones
- 1987 All in a Tiz
- 1987 Familiar Signs
- 1990 Six Visual Sonnets
- 1991 Soap Box
- 1993 To Cythera! 4 poems with etchings by Friedrich Danielis
- 1994 At the Edge of the World
- 1996 The Electric Alphabet, with etchings by Jiři Sindler
- 2024 An Alphabet
- 2024 Pythagorean Sonnet
- 2024 Seven Sisters
