= Para River =

Para River may refer to:

- Pará River in Brazil
- Pará River (Minas Gerais) in southeastern Brazil
- Para Creek in Suriname. Sometimes called Para River
- Para River in India's Himachal Pradesh that flows through Ladakh and Tibet
- Para (Russia) in the central European part of Russia
- The Para Rivers in South Australia
  - Little Para River
  - North Para River
  - South Para River
  - The North and South Para Rivers join at Gawler to form the Gawler River (South Australia)
