= Tabou Airport =

Airport in Ivory Coast

- IATA: TXU; ICAO: DITB

Summary
- Airport type: Public
- Serves: Tabou
- Elevation AMSL: 39 ft (12 m)
- Coordinates: 4°26′15″N 7°21′45″W

Map
- Location within Ivory Coast

Runways
Direction	Length		Surface
Direction	ft	m	Surface
16/34	4,086	1,245	Unpaved
- Source: Google Maps

Tabou Airport (IATA: TXU, ICAO: DITB) is an airport serving Tabou, Côte d'Ivoire.

== See also ==
- Transport in Côte d'Ivoire
