= Brazilian ship Pará =

Several ships of the Brazilian Navy have borne the name Pará

- Brazilian monitor Pará, a Pará-class monitor launched in 1867 and discarded in 1884
- Brazilian destroyer Pará (1908), a Pará-class destroyer
- Brazilian destroyer Pará (1959) (pennant number D27), the lead ship of the Pará class of destroyers for the Brazilian Navy; the former American Fletcher class USS Guest (DD-472); acquired by the Brazilian Navy in 1959; scrapped in 1978
- Brazilian destroyer Pará (1989) (pennant number D27), the former American Garcia-class frigate USS Albert David (FF-1050); acquired by the Brazilian Navy in 1989 and classed as a destroyer; decommissioned in 2008 and in reserve
