= Para, Rajasthan =

Para
- Village
- Location within Rajasthan Location within India
- Coordinates: 25°52′41.63″N 75°11′10.57″E
- Country: India
- State: Rajasthan
- District: Ajmer
- Named for: Pareshwar Nath Mahadev

Government
  - Type: Democratic
  - Sarpanch: Smt. Govind Kanwar Rathore

Area
  - Total: 23.6 km^{2} (9.11 sq mi)
- Elevation: 440 m (1,440 ft)

Population (2011)
  - Total: 3,752
  - Density: 159/km^{2} (412/sq mi)

Languages
  - Official: Marwari, Hindi
- Time zone: UTC+5:30 (IST)
- Pincode(s): 305 408
- Area code(s): +91-1467-XXX-XXXX
- ISO 3166 code: RJ-IN
- Vehicle registration: RJ-48 (Kekri)

Para is a village in Kekri district, in Rajasthan state of India. As of 2011 census of India, its population is 3,752.

It is located at a distance of 408 km from the Indian capital New Delhi, 148 km from the Rajasthan capital Jaipur, 92 km from the district headquarter Ajmer and 12 km from the tehsil headquarters Kekri.

== Toponymy ==
There is a legend associated with the origin of the name Para. It says that the name Para came from the name of Lord Shiva temple which is situated at the southern corner of the village which is called as Pareshwar Nath Temple. The name Pareshwar eroded gradually to become what is now as Para. one temple also Laxminath mandir this temple have also same feeling like pareshwar Madhav in village .The temple is very good

== Geography ==
Para is about 12 km (7 mi) from tehsil headquarter Kekri, 92 km (57 mi) from district headquarter Ajmer, 148 km (92 mi) from state capital Jaipur, 119 km (74 mi) from Kota, 115 km (71 mi) from Bhilwara, and 405 km (252 mi) from the national capital New Delhi. It has an average elevation of 440 meters.

== Demographics ==
As of 2011, Para had a population of 3752 According to census of 2011.The majority of population is Hindu which accounts for over 99%, with a few Muslim and Jains The overall literacy rate for the village is 44.45%. 59.14% males and 28.99% females were literate. The sex ratio was 950 females per 1,000 males.

== Transport ==
Para is situated on the state highway RJ SH 26 which connects two major cities of Rajasthan Ajmer and Kota. Regular bus service from Rajasthan State Road Transport Corporation ltd is available from New Delhi, Bhopal, Ujjain, Indore, Ajmer, Kota, Bhilwara, Udaipur, Nagore, Bikaner, Jodhpur and other major cities.
