= Norman Snaith =

Old Testament scholar

- Born: Norman Henry Snaith
- Died: 1982 (aged 83–84)
- Education: Manchester Grammar School; University of Cambridge
- Occupation: Scholar

Norman Henry Snaith (1898–1982) was a British Old Testament scholar and a professor at Wesley College, Leeds.

== Education and early life ==
Snaith was the son of a Primitive Methodist minister. He was educated at Manchester Grammar School and Corpus Christi College, Oxford, reading mathematics before studying Semitic languages under George Buchanan Gray at Mansfield College.

== Career ==
Snaith became a Primitive Methodist minister, taking up pastoral work until appointed Professor of Old Testament at Wesley College in 1936. He became Principal of Wesley College in 1954, and retired in 1961. In 1957, Snaith was president of the Society for Old Testament Study.

== Publications by Snaith ==
- Studies in the Psalter, 1934
- The distinctive ideas of the Old Testament, 1944
- Notes on the Hebrew text of 2 Samuel, XVI-XIX (Study Notes on Bible Books), 1945
- The Book of Job (Study Notes on Bible Books), 1945
- Notes on the Hebrew text of Job, I-VI (Study Notes on Bible Books), 1945
- The Psalms; a short introduction (Study Notes on Bible Books), 1945
- Notes on the Hebrew text of Isaiah, chapters XXVIII-XXXII (Study Notes on Bible Books), 1945
- Notes on the Hebrew text of Jeremiah, chapters III, VII and XXXI (Study Notes on Bible Books), 1945
- Notes in the Hebrew text of Jonah (Study Notes on Bible Books), 1945
- The Book of Amos; pt. 1: Introduction (Study Notes on Bible Books), 1946
- The Book of Amos; pt. 2: Translation and notes (Study Notes on Bible Books), 1946
- Notes on the Hebrew text of Genesis I-VIII (Study Notes on Bible Books), 1947
- The Jewish New Year festival, 1948
- The Jews from Cyrus to Herod, 1949
- Notes on the Hebrew text of Genesis XL-XLIV (Study Notes on Bible Books), 1950
- Hymns of the Temple, 1951
- Mercy and sacrifice; a study of the book of Hosea, 1953
- Notes on the Hebrew Text of I Kings XVII–XIX and XXI–XXII (Study Notes on Bible Books), 1954
- Amos, Hosea and Micah (Epworth Preacher's Commentaries), 1956
- (British and Foreign Bible Society) Hebrew Old Testament, 1958
- Leviticus and Numbers (The Century Bible, New Edition), 1967
- The Book of Job; its origin and purpose, 1968
