= Tabou, Ivory Coast =

Tabou
- Town, sub-prefecture, and commune
- Location in Ivory Coast
- Coordinates: 4°25′N 7°21′W
- Country: Ivory Coast
- District: Bas-Sassandra
- Region: San-Pédro
- Department: Tabou

Area
  - Total: 429 km^{2} (166 sq mi)

Population (2021 census)
  - Total: 62,719
  - Density: 146/km^{2} (379/sq mi)
  - Town: 22,733
- (2014 census)
- Time zone: UTC+0 (GMT)

Tabou is a town in the far southwest of Ivory Coast, near the border of Liberia. It is a sub-prefecture of and the seat of Tabou Department in San-Pédro Region, Bas-Sassandra District. Tabou is also a commune.

In 2021, the population of the sub-prefecture of Tabou was 62,719.

== Villages ==
The 32 villages of the sub-prefecture of Tabou and their population in 2014 are:

1. Bianké (304)
2. Blédiéké (152)
3. Boké (2 043)
4. Dégné (191)
5. Douke (97)
6. Douopo (381)
7. Gbaouloké (325)
8. Gléroké (232)
9. Gliké V1 (1 201)
10. Gliké V3 (688)
11. Hiépodioké (370)
12. Ombloké (295)
13. Sékréké (495)
14. Souké (203)
15. Tabou (22 733)
16. Tolou (209)
17. Yonaké (245)
18. Besséréké (471)
19. Boubélé (1 355)
20. Déhié (1 537)
21. Gliké V2 (719)
22. Gliké Village (129)
23. Gnadjipo (96)
24. Gotouké (763)
25. Guirou (352)
26. Irodioké (223)
27. Kabiadioké (182)
28. Klatoué (312)
29. Ménéké (1 481)
30. Ouédjiré (837)
31. Oulidié (46)
32. Toulaké (323)

== Climate ==
Tabou has a tropical monsoon climate under the Köppen climate classification, with a long wet season.

Climate data for Tabou, Ivory Coast
Month	Jan	Feb	Mar	Apr	May	Jun	Jul	Aug	Sep	Oct	Nov	Dec	Year
Mean daily maximum °C (°F)	29.9 (85.8)	30.6 (87.1)	30.9 (87.6)	31.3 (88.3)	29.5 (85.1)	27.8 (82.0)	27.0 (80.6)	26.4 (79.5)	27.1 (80.8)	28.2 (82.8)	29.0 (84.2)	29.3 (84.7)	28.9 (84.0)
Daily mean °C (°F)	25.6 (78.1)	26.5 (79.7)	26.7 (80.1)	26.7 (80.1)	26.3 (79.3)	25.3 (77.5)	24.6 (76.3)	24.2 (75.6)	24.6 (76.3)	25.3 (77.5)	25.8 (78.4)	25.6 (78.1)	25.6 (78.1)
Mean daily minimum °C (°F)	21.5 (70.7)	22.2 (72.0)	22.4 (72.3)	22.5 (72.5)	22.8 (73.0)	22.6 (72.7)	22.0 (71.6)	21.9 (71.4)	22.1 (71.8)	22.4 (72.3)	22.4 (72.3)	21.9 (71.4)	22.2 (72.0)
Average rainfall mm (inches)	45.6 (1.80)	43.1 (1.70)	75.7 (2.98)	134.1 (5.28)	367.4 (14.46)	544.3 (21.43)	222.0 (8.74)	154.3 (6.07)	233.9 (9.21)	169.3 (6.67)	178.0 (7.01)	130.8 (5.15)	2,298.5 (90.5)
Mean monthly sunshine hours	197.7	191.5	195.8	201.3	157.9	90.3	94.4	83.8	84.1	185.6	210.9	188.6	1,881.9
Source: NOAA
