= Tabou Department =

Coordinates: 4°25′N 7°22′W

Tabou Department Département de Tabou
- Department
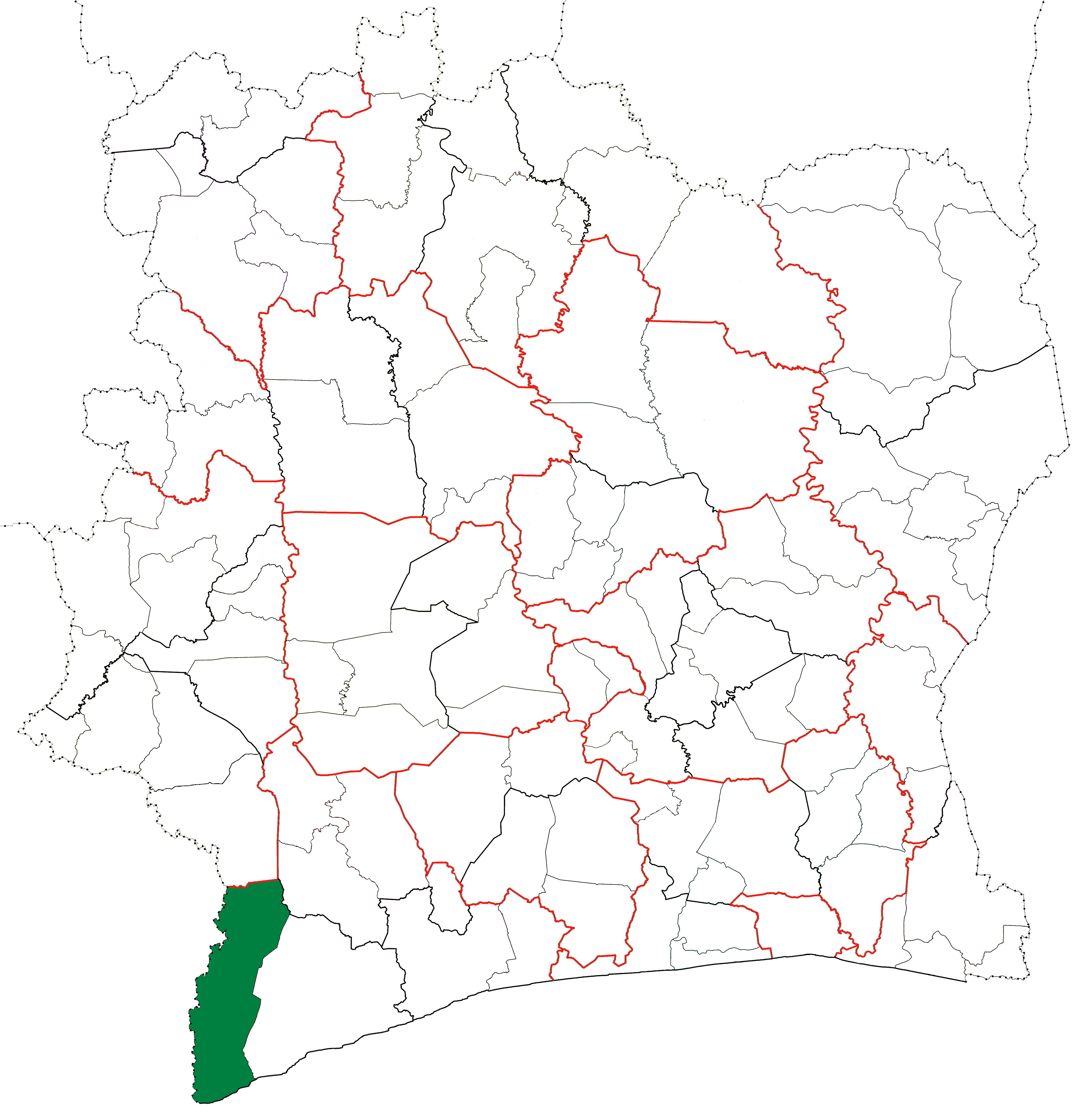
- Location in Ivory Coast. Tabou Department has retained the same boundaries since its creation in 1988.
- Country: Ivory Coast
- District: Bas-Sassandra
- Region: San-Pédro
- 1988: Established as a first-level subdivision via a division of Sassandra Dept
- 1997: Converted to a second-level subdivision
- 2011: Converted to a third-level subdivision
- Departmental seat: Tabou

Government
  - Prefect: Yacouba Doumbia

Area
  - Total: 5,180 km^{2} (2,000 sq mi)

Population (2021 census)
  - Total: 270,482
  - Density: 52.2/km^{2} (135/sq mi)
- Time zone: UTC+0 (GMT)

Tabou Department is a department of San-Pédro Region in Bas-Sassandra District, Ivory Coast. In 2021, its population was 270,482 and its seat is the settlement of Tabou. The sub-prefectures of the department are Dapo-Iboké, Djamandioké, Djouroutou, Grabo, Olodio, and Tabou. It is the southernmost department of Ivory Coast.

== History ==
Tabou Department was created in 1988 as a first-level subdivision via a split-off from Sassandra Department.

In 1997, regions were introduced as new first-level subdivisions of Ivory Coast; as a result, all departments were converted into second-level subdivisions. Tabou Department was included in Bas-Sassandra Region.

In 2011, districts were introduced as new first-level subdivisions of Ivory Coast. At the same time, regions were reorganised and became second-level subdivisions and all departments were converted into third-level subdivisions. At this time, Tabou Department became part of San-Pédro Region in Bas-Sassandra District.

== Transport ==
The department is serviced by Tabou Airport.
