= San-Pédro Department =

Coordinates: 4°45′N 6°38′W

San-Pédro Department Département de San-Pédro
- Department
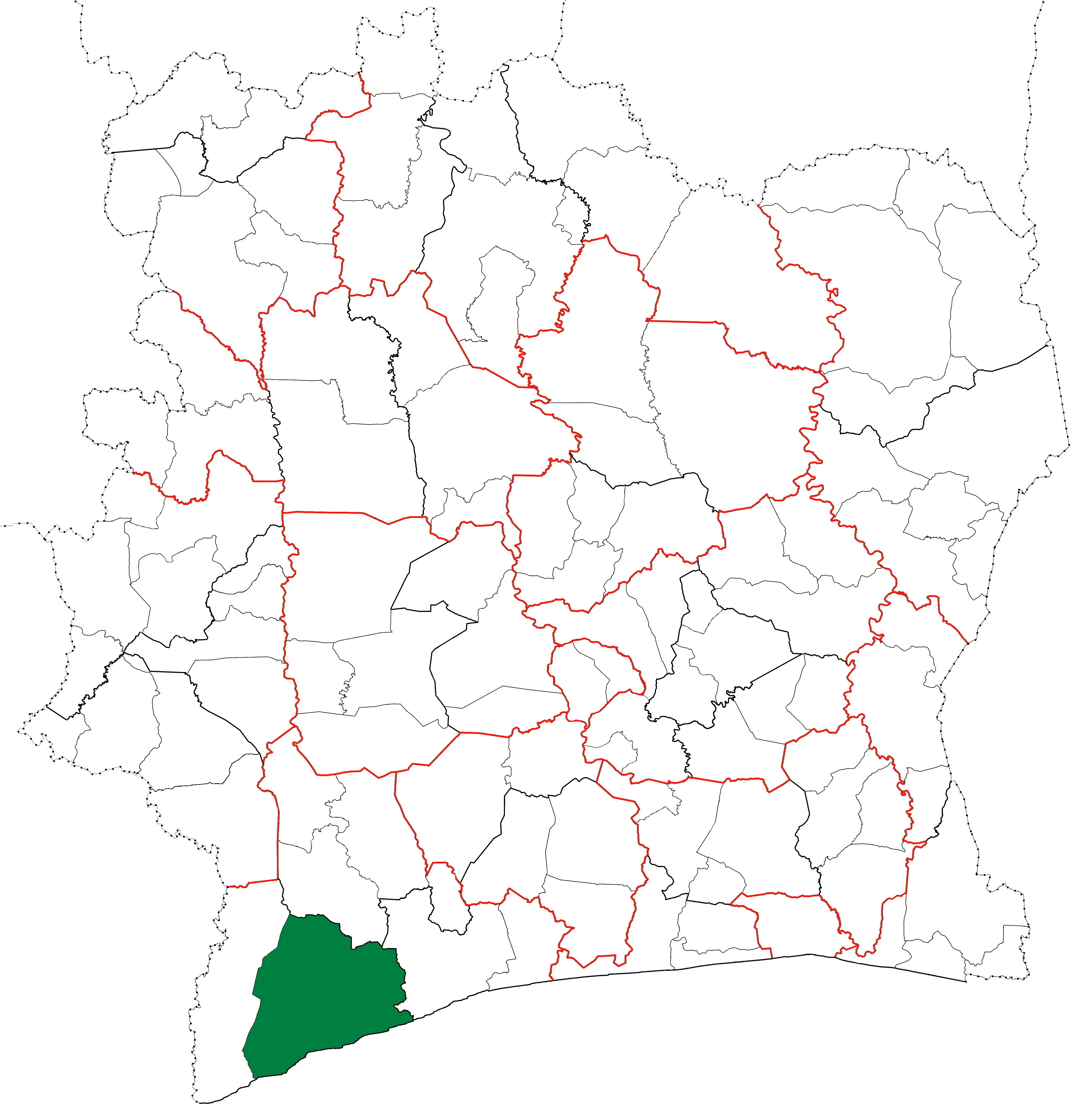
- Location in Ivory Coast. San-Pédro Department has retained the same boundaries since its creation in 1988.
- Country: Ivory Coast
- District: Bas-Sassandra
- Region: San-Pédro
- 1988: Established as a first-level subdivision via a division of Sassandra Dept
- 1997: Converted to a second-level subdivision
- 2011: Converted to a third-level subdivision
- Departmental seat: San-Pédro

Government
  - Prefect: Ousman Coulibaly

Area
  - Total: 7,110 km^{2} (2,750 sq mi)

Population (2021 census)
  - Total: 790,242
  - Density: 111/km^{2} (288/sq mi)
- Time zone: UTC+0 (GMT)

San-Pédro Department is a department of San-Pédro Region in Bas-Sassandra District, Ivory Coast. In 2021, its population was 790,242 and its seat the settlement of San-Pédro. The sub-prefectures of the department are Doba, Dogbo, Gabiadji, Grand-Béréby, and San-Pédro.

== History ==
San-Pédro Department was created in 1988 as a first-level subdivision via a split-off from Sassandra Department.

In 1997, regions were introduced as new first-level subdivisions of Ivory Coast; as a result, all departments were converted into second-level subdivisions. San-Pédro Department was included in Bas-Sassandra Region.

In 2011, districts were introduced as new first-level subdivisions of Ivory Coast. At the same time, regions were reorganised and became second-level subdivisions and all departments were converted into third-level subdivisions. At this time, San-Pédro Department became part of San-Pédro Region in Bas-Sassandra District.
