= San-Pédro Region =

Coordinates: 4°45′N 6°38′W

San-Pédro Region Région de San-Pédro
- Region
- Seal

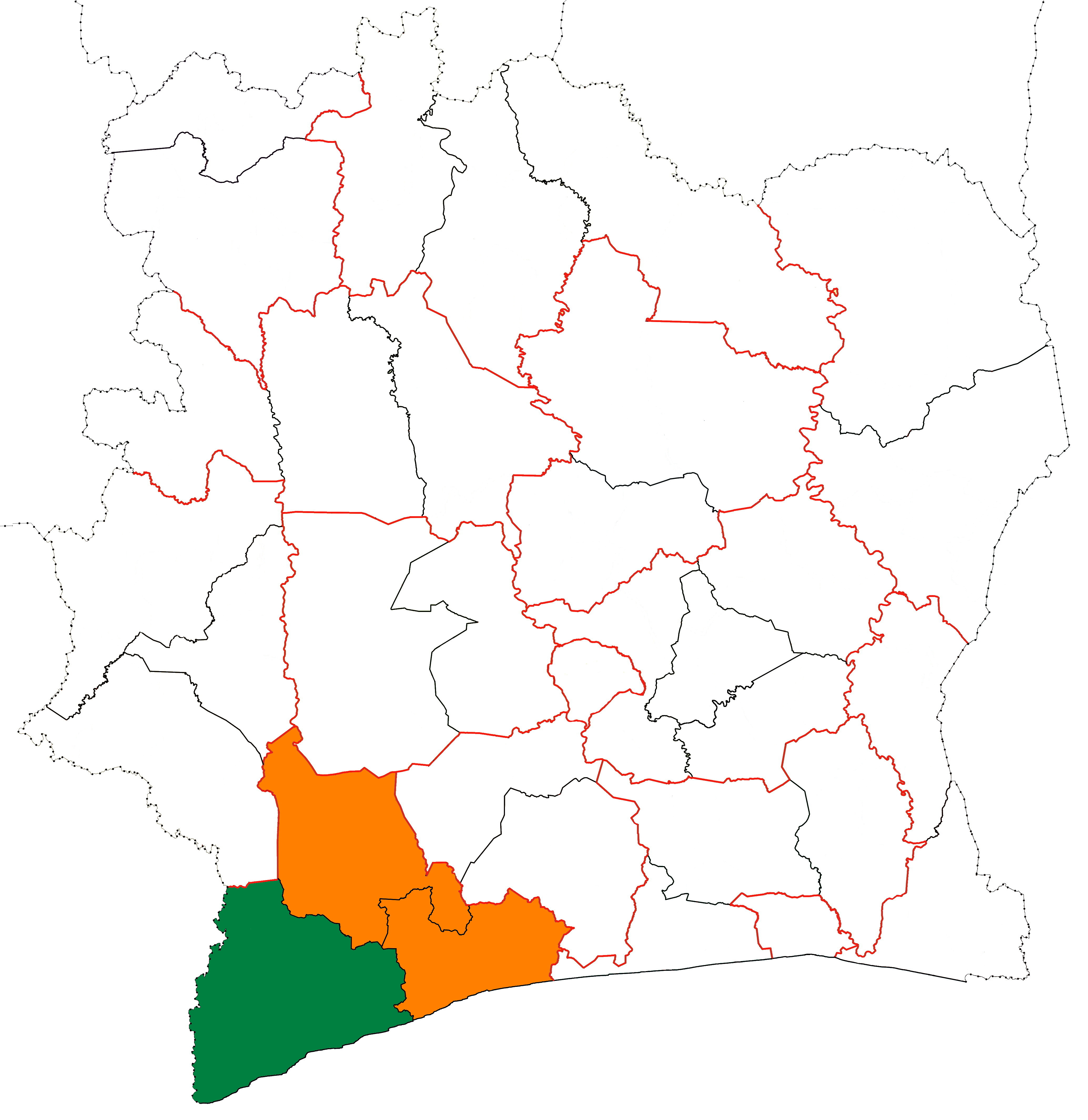
- Location of San-Pédro Region (green) in Ivory Coast and in Bas-Sassandra District
- Country: Ivory Coast
- District: Bas-Sassandra
- 2011: Established
- Regional seat: San-Pédro

Government
  - Prefect: Ousman Coulibaly
  - Council President: Donatien Beugre

Area
  - Total: 12,290 km^{2} (4,750 sq mi)

Population (2021 census)
  - Total: 1,060,724
  - Density: 86.31/km^{2} (223.5/sq mi)
- Time zone: UTC+0 (GMT)

San-Pédro Region is one of the 31 regions of Ivory Coast. Since its establishment in 2011, it has been one of three regions in Bas-Sassandra District. The seat of the region is San-Pédro and the region's population in the 2021 census was 1,060,724.

San-Pédro is currently divided into two departments: San-Pédro and Tabou.
