= Mabéhiri 1 =

- Village
- Location in Ivory Coast
- Coordinates: 5°41′N 6°25′W
- Country: Ivory Coast
- District: Bas-Sassandra
- Region: Nawa
- Department: Soubré
- Sub-prefecture: Okrouyo

Population (2014 census)
  - Village: 17,909
- Time zone: UTC+0 (GMT)

Mabéhiri 1 is a village in south-western Ivory Coast. It is in the sub-prefecture of Okrouyo, Soubré Department, Nawa Region, Bas-Sassandra District.

Mabéhiri 1 was a commune until March 2012, when it became one of 1,126 communes nationwide that were abolished.
