= Gadago =

Gadago Gadao
- Village
- Location in Ivory Coast
- Coordinates: 6°8′N 6°27′W
- Country: Ivory Coast
- District: Bas-Sassandra
- Region: Nawa
- Department: Soubré
- Sub-prefecture: Grand-Zattry
- Time zone: UTC+0 (GMT)

Gadago (also spelled Gadao) is a village in south-western Ivory Coast. It is in the sub-prefecture of Grand-Zattry, Soubré Department, Nawa Region, Bas-Sassandra District.

Gadago was a commune until March 2012, when it became one of 1,126 communes nationwide that were abolished.
