= Koréahinou =

- Village
- Location in Ivory Coast
- Coordinates: 6°26′N 7°6′W
- Country: Ivory Coast
- District: Bas-Sassandra
- Region: Nawa
- Department: Soubré
- Sub-prefecture: Buyo
- Time zone: UTC+0 (GMT)

Koréahinou is a village in western Ivory Coast. It is in the sub-prefecture of Buyo, Soubré Department, Nawa Region, Bas-Sassandra District.

Koréahinou was a commune until March 2012, when it became one of 1,126 communes nationwide that were abolished.
