= Gnagboya =

Gnagboya Gnaboya
- Village
- Location in Ivory Coast
- Coordinates: 5°53′N 6°51′W
- Country: Ivory Coast
- District: Bas-Sassandra
- Region: Nawa
- Department: Méagui
- Sub-prefecture: Gnanmangui
- Time zone: UTC+0 (GMT)

Gnagboya (also spelled Gnaboya) is a village in south-western Ivory Coast. It is in the sub-prefecture of Gnanmangui, Méagui Department, Nawa Region, Bas-Sassandra District.

Gnagboya was a commune until March 2012, when it became one of 1,126 communes nationwide that were abolished.
