= Dassioko =

- Village
- Location in Ivory Coast
- Coordinates: 5°7′N 5°50′W
- Country: Ivory Coast
- District: Bas-Sassandra
- Region: Gbôklé
- Department: Fresco
- Sub-prefecture: Fresco
- Time zone: UTC+0 (GMT)

Dassioko is a village in south-western Ivory Coast. It is in the sub-prefecture of Fresco, Fresco Department, Gbôklé Region, Bas-Sassandra District.

Dassioko was a commune until March 2012, when it became one of 1,126 communes nationwide that were abolished.
