= Takoréagui =

- Village
- Location in Ivory Coast
- Coordinates: 5°45′20″N 6°47′30″W
- Country: Ivory Coast
- District: Bas-Sassandra
- Region: Nawa
- Department: Méagui
- Sub-prefecture: Méagui
- Time zone: UTC+0 (GMT)

Takoréagui is a village in southwestern Ivory Coast. It is in the sub-prefecture of Méagui, Méagui Department, Nawa Region, Bas-Sassandra District.

Takoréagui was a commune until March 2012, when it became one of 1,126 communes nationwide that were abolished.
