= Yabayo =

- Village
- Location in Ivory Coast
- Coordinates: 5°57′N 6°36′W
- Country: Ivory Coast
- District: Bas-Sassandra
- Region: Nawa
- Department: Soubré
- Sub-prefecture: Soubré

Population (2014 census)
  - Village: 20,086
- Time zone: UTC+0 (GMT)

Yabayo is a village in southwestern Ivory Coast. It is located in the sub-prefecture of Soubré, Soubré Department, Nawa Region, Bas-Sassandra District.

Yabayo was a commune until March 2012, when it became one of 1,126 communes nationwide that were abolished.
