= Bricolo =

- Village
- Location in Ivory Coast
- Coordinates: 5°51′N 6°38′W
- Country: Ivory Coast
- District: Bas-Sassandra
- Region: Nawa
- Department: Soubré
- Sub-prefecture: Soubré
- Time zone: UTC+0 (GMT)

Bricolo is a village in south-western Ivory Coast. It is in the sub-prefecture of Soubré, Soubré Department, Nawa Region, Bas-Sassandra District.

Bricolo was a commune until March 2012, when it became one of 1,126 communes nationwide that were abolished.
