= Tabayo 1 =

Tabayo 1 Tagbayo 1
- Village
- Location in Ivory Coast
- Coordinates: 5°38′N 6°13′W
- Country: Ivory Coast
- District: Bas-Sassandra
- Region: Nawa
- Department: Guéyo
- Sub-prefecture: Guéyo
- Time zone: UTC+0 (GMT)

Tabayo 1 (also spelled Tagbayo 1) is a village in southwestern Ivory Coast. It is in the sub-prefecture of Guéyo, Guéyo Department, Nawa Region, Bas-Sassandra District.

Tabayo 1 was a commune until March 2012, when it became one of 1,126 communes nationwide that were abolished.
