= Baléko =

- Village
- Location in Ivory Coast
- Coordinates: 5°26′N 6°2′W
- Country: Ivory Coast
- District: Bas-Sassandra
- Region: Nawa
- Department: Guéyo
- Sub-prefecture: Dabouyo
- Time zone: UTC+0 (GMT)

Baléko is a village in south-western Ivory Coast. It is in the sub-prefecture of Dabouyo, Guéyo Department, Nawa Region, Bas-Sassandra District.

Baléko was a commune until March 2012, when it became one of 1,126 communes nationwide that were abolished.
