= Gbliglo =

- Village
- Location in Ivory Coast
- Coordinates: 5°55′N 6°53′W
- Country: Ivory Coast
- District: Bas-Sassandra
- Region: Nawa
- Department: Soubré
- Sub-prefecture: Dapéoua
- Time zone: UTC+0 (GMT)

Gbliglo is a village in south-western Ivory Coast. It is in the sub-prefecture of Dapéoua, Soubré Department, Nawa Region, Bas-Sassandra District. The village sits on the edge of Taï National Park.

Gbliglo was a commune until March 2012, when it became one of 1,126 communes nationwide that were abolished.
