= Wonséaly =

Wonséaly Wonséably
- Village
- Location in Ivory Coast
- Coordinates: 6°0′N 6°58′W
- Country: Ivory Coast
- District: Bas-Sassandra
- Region: Nawa
- Department: Soubré
- Sub-prefecture: s/p de Buyo
- Time zone: UTC+0 (GMT)

Wonséaly (also spelled Wonséably) is a village in southwestern Ivory Coast. It is in the sub-prefecture of Dapéoua, Soubré Department, Nawa Region, Bas-Sassandra District. The village is on the northeastern edge of Taï National Park.

Wonséaly was a commune until March 2012, when it became one of 1,126 communes nationwide that were abolished.
