= Ottawa, Ivory Coast =

Ottawa
- Village
- Location in Ivory Coast
- Coordinates: 5°43′N 6°16′W
- Country: Ivory Coast
- District: Bas-Sassandra
- Region: Nawa
- Department: Soubré
- Sub-prefecture: Okrouyo
- Time zone: UTC+0 (GMT)

Ottawa is a village in southwestern Ivory Coast. It is in the sub-prefecture of Okrouyo, Soubré Department, Nawa Region, Bas-Sassandra District.

Ottawa was a commune until March 2012, when it became one of 1,126 communes nationwide that were abolished.
