= Gbagbam =

Gbagbam Grand Babam
- Town and sub-prefecture
- Location in Ivory Coast
- Coordinates: 5°28′N 5°35′W
- Country: Ivory Coast
- District: Bas-Sassandra
- Region: Gbôklé
- Department: Fresco

Population (2014)
  - Total: 23,649
- Time zone: UTC+0 (GMT)

Gbagbam (also known as Grand Babam) is a town in southern Ivory Coast. It is a sub-prefecture of Fresco Department in Gbôklé Region, Bas-Sassandra District.

Gbagbam was a commune until March 2012, when it became one of 1,126 communes nationwide that were abolished.

In 2014, the population of the sub-prefecture of Gbagbam was 23,649.

== Villages ==
The six villages of the sub-prefecture of Gbagbam and their population in 2014 are:

1. Digbodou (549)
2. Gabililié (1,920)
3. Gbagbam (13,654)
4. Grogbaledou (3,523)
5. Kroukrou (2,918)
6. Zakpaberi (1,085)
