= Oupoyo =

- Town and sub-prefecture
- Location in Ivory Coast
- Coordinates: 5°34′N 6°36′W
- Country: Ivory Coast
- District: Bas-Sassandra
- Region: Nawa
- Department: Méagui

Area
  - Total: 836 km^{2} (323 sq mi)

Population (2021 census)
  - Total: 61,973
  - Density: 74.1/km^{2} (192/sq mi)
  - Town: 18,386
- (2014 census)
- Time zone: UTC+0 (GMT)

Oupoyo is a town in southwestern Ivory Coast. It is a sub-prefecture of Méagui Department in Nawa Region, Bas-Sassandra District.

The far western portion of the sub-prefecture is located in Taï National Park.

Oupoyo was a commune until March 2012, when it became one of 1,126 communes nationwide that were abolished.

In 2021, the population of the sub-prefecture of Oupoyo was 61,973.

== Villages ==
The fifteen villages of the sub-prefecture of Oupoyo and their population in 2014 are:

1. Dahili (5,076)
2. Gblétia (8,595)
3. Gnakoragui (1,760)
4. Gnipi 2 (5,769)
5. Guéagui (1,086)
6. Guiré (1,225)
7. Ipouagui (7,788)
8. Koréagui (1,880)
9. Koréagui 2 (3,409)
10. N'driagui (3,253)
11. Oupagui (3,251)
12. Oupoyo (18,386)
13. Petit-Bondoukou (3,772)
14. Robert-Porte (3,418)
15. Sérigbangan (4,538)
