= Gnanmangui =

Gnanmangui Gnamandji
- City and sub-prefecture
- Location in Ivory Coast
- Coordinates: 5°49′N 6°42′W
- Country: Ivory Coast
- District: Bas-Sassandra
- Region: Nawa
- Department: Méagui

Population (2014)
  - Total: 116,476
- Time zone: UTC+0 (GMT)

Gnanmangui (also spelled Gnamandji) is a bakwé city in south-western Ivory Coast. It is a sub-prefecture of Méagui Department in Nawa Region, Bas-Sassandra District.

The western third of the sub-prefecture is located in Taï National Park.

Gnanmangui was a commune until March 2012, when it became one of 1,126 communes nationwide that were abolished.

In 2014, the population of the sub-prefecture of Gnanmangui was 116,476.

== Villages ==
The twenty five villages of the sub-prefecture of Gnanmangui and their population in 2014 are:

1. Adamagui (3,180)
2. Amaragui (3,995)
3. Anagba (4,274)
4. Angagui (4,772)
5. Blédouagui (3,746)
6. Brouagui (4,266)
7. Djigbagui (7,262)
8. Gbatina (2,523)
9. Gnanmangui (2,765)
10. Hana (3,757)
11. Johin (8,703)
12. Kangagui (4,950)
13. Kouakouagui (1,987)
14. Koupéro (3,308)
15. Kpangban (4,199)
16. Liagui (3,002)
17. Louogba (3,487)
18. N'gosséagui (1,729)
19. N'ziagui (2,546)
20. Petit Tieme (6,989)
21. Pokouagui (2,905)
22. Sarakagui (8,783)
23. Takoréagui (7,184)
24. Walébo (10,696)
25. Ziéagui (5,467)
