= Dabouyo =

Dabouyo Dabouyo I
- Town and sub-prefecture
- Location in Ivory Coast
- Coordinates: 5°33′N 6°2′W
- Country: Ivory Coast
- District: Bas-Sassandra
- Region: Nawa
- Department: Guéyo

Area
  - Total: 600 km^{2} (230 sq mi)

Population (2021 census)
  - Total: 45,751
  - Density: 76/km^{2} (200/sq mi)
  - Town: 17,015
- (2014 census)
- Time zone: UTC+0 (GMT)

Dabouyo (also spelled Dagbaro) is a town in south-western Ivory Coast. It is a sub-prefecture of Guéyo Department in Nawa Region, Bas-Sassandra District.

Dabouyo was a commune until March 2012, when it became one of 1,126 communes nationwide that were abolished.

In 2021, the population of the sub-prefecture of Dabouyo was 45,751.

== Villages ==
The ten villages of the sub-prefecture of Dabouyo and their population in 2014 are:

1. Alikro (2,186)
2. Bakadou (3,691)
3. Bakayo (7,247)
4. Baléko (4,971)
5. Bobouo (1,559)
6. Dabouyo (1,405)
7. Dabouyo 2 (2,827)
8. Dabouyo (17,015)
9. Djégnadou (2,753)
10. Zohourayo (2,813)
