= Guéyo =

- Town, sub-prefecture, and commune
- Location in Ivory Coast
- Coordinates: 5°41′N 6°4′W
- Country: Ivory Coast
- District: Bas-Sassandra
- Region: Nawa
- Department: Guéyo

Population (2014)
  - Total: 39,213
- Time zone: UTC+0 (GMT)

Guéyo is a town in south-western Ivory Coast. It is a sub-prefecture of and the seat of Guéyo Department in Nawa Region, Bas-Sassandra District. Guéyo is also a commune.

In 2014, the population of the sub-prefecture of Guéyo was 39,213.

== Villages ==
The nineteen villages of the sub-prefecture of Guéyo and their population in 2014 are:

1. Brétihio (3 859 )
2. Dagouayo (289 )
3. Godiayo 1 (74 )
4. Guéyo (11 633 )
5. Kossoyo (1 191 )
6. Tchédjélé (938 )
7. Bangalidougou (1248 )
8. Bobouo 2 (3 077 )
9. Bodouhio (2 695 )
10. Bodouhio-Bloc (1420 )
11. Godiayo (2 500 )
12. Lahouridou 1 (1 064 )
13. Lahouridou 2 (1 081 )
14. Niorouhio (5 350 )
15. Tagbayo 1 (1 289 )
16. Tagbayo 2 (598 )
17. Tagbayo-Dioulabougou (1 432 )
18. Ziwayo 1 (1 426 )
19. Ziwayo 2 (49 )
