= Buyo =

Buyo may refer to:

- Buyō, traditional Japanese performing art of dance and mime
- Buyo, Ivory Coast, a town in Haut-Sassandra region
  - Lake Buyo, an artificial lake near the town
- Francisco Buyo (Paco Buyo, 1958–), Spanish footballer
- Buyo, Polangui, a barangay in the Philippines.
