= Fresco, Ivory Coast =

Fresco
- Town, sub-prefecture, and commune
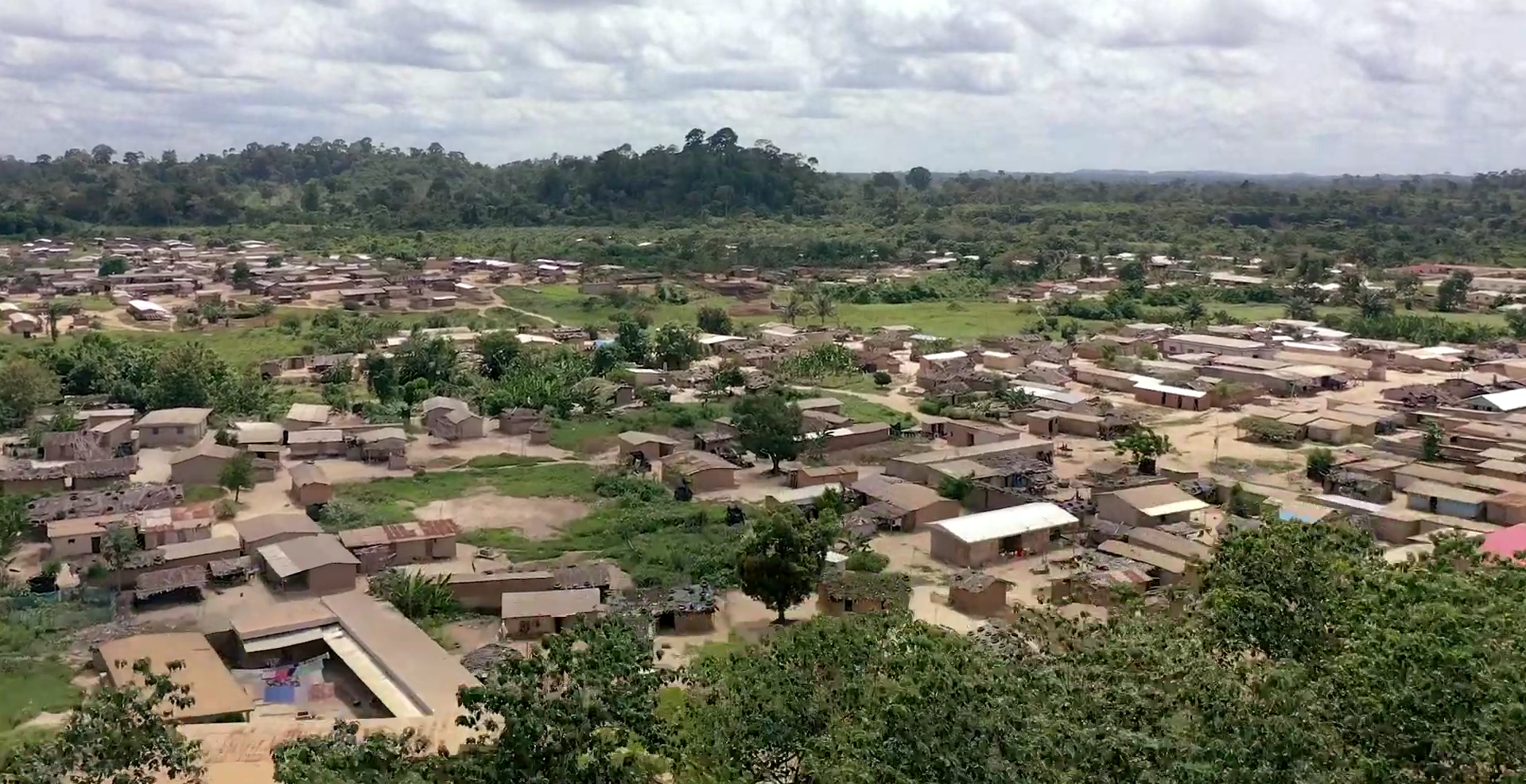

- Location in Ivory Coast
- Coordinates: 5°5′N 5°34′W
- Country: Ivory Coast
- District: Bas-Sassandra
- Region: Gbôklé
- Department: Fresco

Population (2014)
  - Total: 41,058
- Time zone: UTC+0 (GMT)

Designations

Ramsar Wetland
- Official name: Fresco
- Designated: 18 October 2005
- Reference no.: 1582

Fresco is a town in southern Ivory Coast. It is a sub-prefecture of and the seat of Fresco Department in Gbôklé Region, Bas-Sassandra District. Fresco is also a commune.

In 2014, the population of the sub-prefecture of Fresco was 41,058.

== Villages ==
The nine villages of the sub-prefecture of Fresco and their population in 2014 are:

1. Bohico (203)
2. Fresco (8 533)
3. Zakaréko (4 260)
4. Zégban 1 (6 401)
5. Zégban 2 (4 278)
6. Bolorouko (3 047)
7. Dassioko (4 653)
8. Kosso (5 313)
9. Zuzuoko (4 370)
