= Dahiri, Ivory Coast =

Dahiri Dairi
- Town and sub-prefecture
- Location in Ivory Coast
- Coordinates: 5°17′N 5°32′W
- Country: Ivory Coast
- District: Bas-Sassandra
- Region: Gbôklé
- Department: Fresco

Population (2014)
  - Total: 36,591
- Time zone: UTC+0 (GMT)

Dahiri (also spelled Dairi) is a town in southern Ivory Coast. It is a sub-prefecture of Fresco Department in Gbôklé Region, Bas-Sassandra District.

Dahiri was a commune until March 2012, when it became one of 1126 communes nationwide that were abolished.

In 2014, the population of the sub-prefecture of Dahiri was 36,591.

== Villages ==
The 4 villages of the sub-prefecture of Dahiri and their population in 2014 are:

1. Dahiri (8 397)
2. Goménébéri (10 131)
3. Okromodou (13 054)
4. Zéribéri (5 009)
