= Marcel Zadi Kessy =

Ivorian politician (1936–2020)

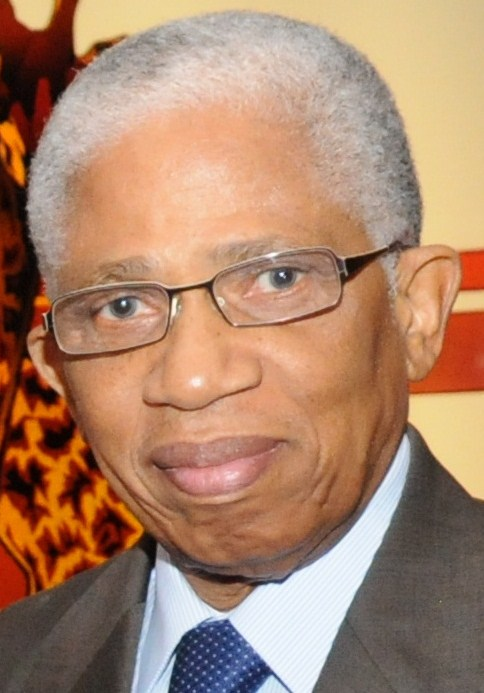
- Kessy in 2012

President of the Economic and Social Council of Ivory Coast
- In office May 2011 – June 2016

CEO of the Compagnie Ivoirienne d'Electricité and SODECI
- In office June 2002 – May 2011

President of the Conseil national du patronat ivoirien
- In office 1993–1998

Personal details
- Born: 1936 Yacolidabouo, French West Africa
- Died: 13 October 2020 (aged 83–84)

Marcel Zadi Kessy (1936 – 13 October 2020) was an Ivorian politician.

== Biography ==
Born in 1936 in Yacolidabouo, Kessy studied engineering in agricultural techniques. He began working for the Ivorian Ministry of Agriculture, then in a state agriculture company, Satmaci. In the early 1970s, Kessy left the public sector and began working for SODECI, the first private water distributor in Africa, as Ivory Coast ceded its water distribution to the private sector in 1959. He became CEO of SODECI in 1985. Kessy served as President of the Conseil national du patronat ivoirien from 1993 to 1998. The Compagnie Ivoirienne d'Electricité (CIE) was established in 1990. Kessy was appointed CEO in June 2002, simultaneously being CEO of SODECI.

Aside from his positions at SODECI and Bouygues, Kessy held multiple other positions at the international level. He was a founding member of the African Water Association, and served on the board of directors of the International Water Association. He held high positions in several other companies, including Ecobank, CIPREL, and Gras Savoye. He served as chairman of the board of directors of the Société Africaine d'Eau Minérale. He became Managing Director of Eranove in 2009. Lastly, he served as President of the Economic and Social Council of Ivory Coast from May 2011 to June 2016.

== Distinctions ==
- Grand Officer of the Ordre national de Côte d'Ivoire
- Knight of the Legion of Honour
- Doctorate honoris causa of RUSTA

== Publications ==
- Culture africaine et gestion de l'entreprise moderne (1998)
- Développement de proximité et gestion des communautés villageoises (2004)
- Responsabilité politique et développement de proximité (2007)
- Renaissances africaines (2010)
