= St. John the Evangelist Anglican Church (Ottawa) =

Coordinates: 45.417752°N 75.689927°W

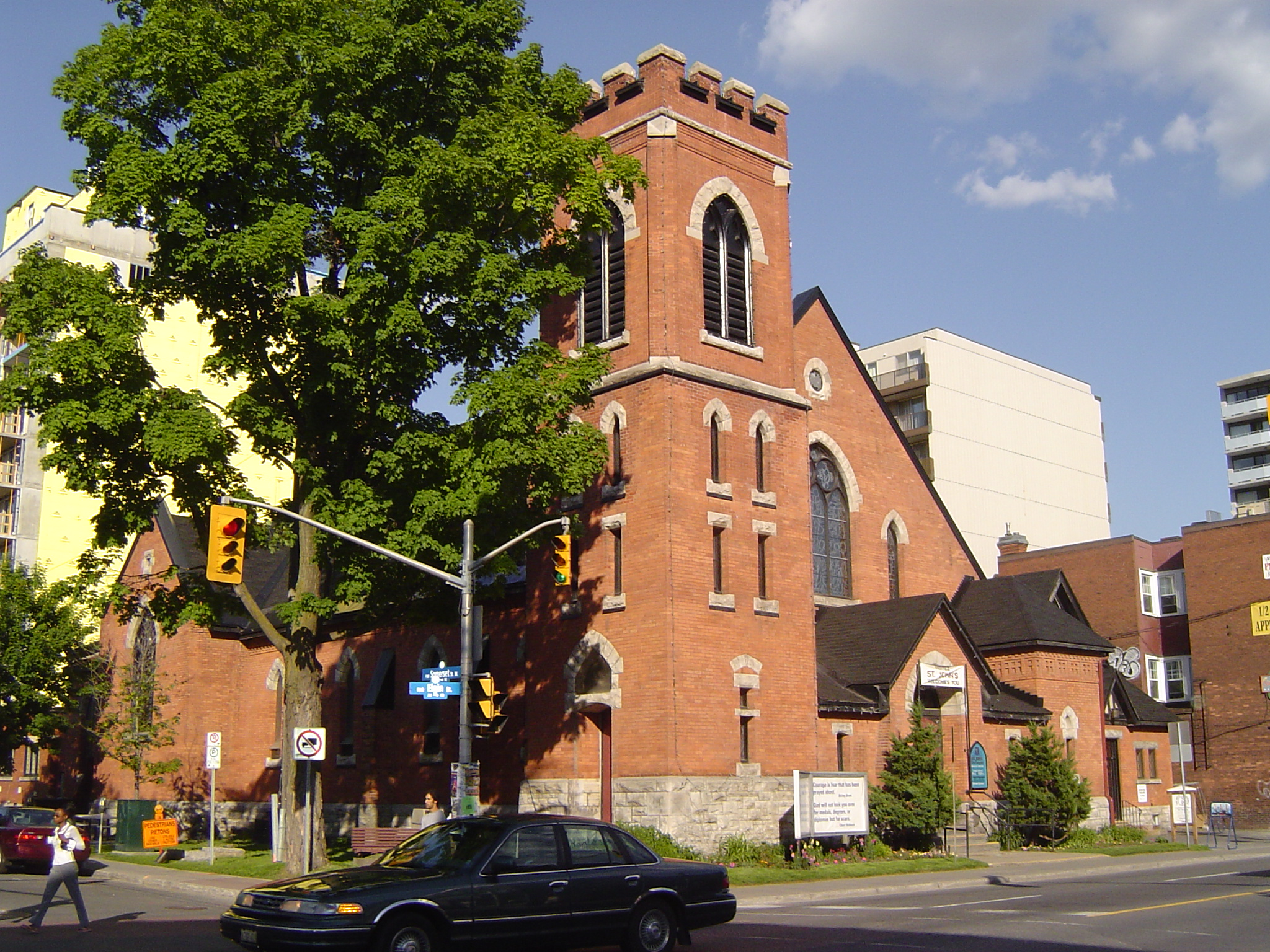
- Denomination: Anglican Church of Canada
- Website: http://www.stjohnsottawa.ca/ Official site

History
- Dedication: St. John the Evangelist

Administration
- Province: Ontario
- Diocese: Ottawa

Clergy
- Rector: The Rev. Canon Gary van der Meer

St. John the Evangelist Anglican Church is an Anglican church in downtown Ottawa, Ontario, Canada, at the corner of Elgin and Somerset streets.

== History ==
=== Creation ===
In 1853, the Duke of Newcastle, in a letter to the Earl of Elgin, then Governor General of the Canadas, deeded a piece of land on the corner of Sussex Drive and Mackenzie Street for the construction of a chapel for Anglican soldiers stationed in Bytown. St. John's began as a mission church of Christ Church on Rideau Street in 1860 (amalgamating with Grace Church on Elgin Street in 1912).

In 1861, a small school and "chapel of ease" was built, under the direction of the parish of Christ Church. Dr. Lauder was the first Incumbent of this house of God.

By 1871, the chapel of ease was named St John's and Bishop John Lewis wished to establish it as the pro-cathedral of the Diocese of Ontario. St. John's soon became known as The Bishop's Chapel, a name it was to have until 1874. In that year, when the congregation of "goodly and godly" people was sufficiently large, the Parish Church of St. John the Evangelist was consecrated and the Reverend H. Pollard was installed as the first Rector.

=== Growth and Present Location ===
In 1889, a furore erupted in St George's Church which was to have a dramatic effect upon the life of St. John's. A small core of thirty people left St. George's over a dispute centering on the liturgy, and this group bought a piece of land at the corner of Elgin and Somerset Streets from James McLaren of Buckingham, Quebec. Mr. J. Hames was hired as the architect and construction began on a new Anglican church. The total agreed cost of the new church was $20,000 and the cornerstone was laid on October 21, 1890.

Within three months, a small congregation was worshipping in the unfinished structure. The first baptism was held on May 15, 1890, when the Rector, James Gorman, christened his son, John. At the annual Vestry of 1891, Father Gorman agreed not to tamper with either the theology or the liturgy of the parish without a two-thirds agreement from the parish. In March, 1891, the Gothic Revival church was completed and consecrated as Grace Church.

At this time, St. John's (Sussex Drive) established a small mission church in Lower Town and this was known as St. Augustine's, Anglesea Square. The church and property were sold in 1921 and the mission was soon demolished. In 1907, the federal government offered to purchase St. John's in order to erect new government buildings. The people continued to worship at St. John's until January 12, 1912, when fire destroyed the building. After the fire, it was suggested that St. John's join with St. Luke's on Somerset Street, an idea which did not appeal to either congregation. A union was then proposed between St. John's and Grace Church, and on November 3, 1913, a new parish was constituted by Vestry and became known as the Church of St. John the Evangelist. The Reverend J. Gorman was Rector, assisted by Canon Pollard as Rector Emeritus.

=== Interior Design ===
The interior construction of the building is unique in that it is entirely of wood, although the outer walls are stone and brick. The sombre interior of the church accentuates the beauty of the many stained-glass windows. Above the Elgin Street entrance is the Ascension window. It complements the window above the main altar which depicts the life of Christ. Each of the windows in the church has been given by parishioners as a thankoffering and they range in age from the Angel (1891) right up to 1990. Each speaks of the mystery and joy of Christ and of the church's commissioning to be Christ's ministers and disciples.

The organ, located in the northeast corner of the church, was built in 1977 by Gabriel Kney of London, Ontario. It contains some 2,000 hand-made pipes, including a unique rank of fanfare trumpets which project horizontally into the church. The area beside the organ is believed to have been the original chapel of the church. This area is now mainly used for choral and instrumental presentations.

A stained glass window was erected to the memory of members of the Perley family.

=== Warriors' Chapel ===
The Warriors' Chapel, completed in 1951 on the site of the old parish tennis courts, stands as a memorial to those of the parish who died in the wars of the twentieth century. It is described as a "quiet and lonely place" for meditation and prayer. The Warrior Chapel erected by the Church of St John the Evangelist and unveiled on 25 February 1951, is dedicated to members of the church who fell during The Great War and World War II. The Chapel includes a stained glass window of St George slaying the dragon. Memorials are dedicated to parishioners Gunner Tom L.F. Martin and to Allan Ure Gilmour, who died in service during the Great War. The Church of St John the Evangelist erected a memorial Chapel, scrolls in wood frame and glass cover, and banner, which was unveiled by Right Reverend Robert Jefferson, Bishop of Ottawa on 25 February 1951. The banner reads "To the glory of God. This Warriors' Chapel was erected in grateful remembrance of those members of St John's Church serving in the Armed Forces who made the supreme sacrifice for their King and country in order that we might continue to live in that freedom which is, by the grace of God, our rightful heritage. Dedicated in the year of our Lord, one thousand nine hundred and fifty." The Chapel was dedicated by Excellency the Governor General of Canada Earl Alexander of Tunis, K.G. to members of the church who died during war. "Give us a quiet place, O GOD. where we may gather together the memories of those who have gone before us, cherish the ideas for which they strove, and take good heart from their devotion, that we may further Thy work here on earth. Amen."

Memorial name panels within the Chapel commemorate the fallen of World War I and World War II, as well as a Roll of Honour for those who served. Also erected in this church is a memorial (a bronze crucifix) to the memory of Captain Frederick Graeme Avery who fell in the war in 1918, and his father Frederick Wells Avery.

The Warrior Chapel flags include: The Navy White Ensign flown in World War II by HMCS Ottawa; The Merchant Navy Red Ensign flown in World War II by Mount Revelstoke Park; The Red Ensign which also represents the Canadian Army; and the Air Force Ensign flown in World War II by the City of Ottawa Squadron, RCAF. A memorial plaque is dedicated to parishioners Flying Officer Allen Garnett Wright, and Stuart Frank Brott who died in service during World War II. A memorial tabled, which is dedicated to members of St Augustine's who died during the Great War, was placed in St John's when the St Augustine's Mission was closed. In 1999-2000 the Church underwent renovations to the Warrior Chapel. The Right Reverend Peter Coffin, Bishop of Ottawa with Guest of Honour Her Excellency the Right Honourable Adrienne Clarkson Governor General of Canada rededicated the Chapel on 12 November 2000.

=== Recent history ===
St. John's describes itself as "a large progressive church with emphasis on liturgical renewal, music, and social service."

The parish's current liturgy is based in the Book of Alternative Services (1985), and music for worship is taken from the broad repertoire of sacred music, representing everything from renaissance and baroque motets to contemporary spirituals and songs of praise.

St. John's has a long history of being an open, welcoming church for gay people. The first rector, Canon Gorman, had a son, Eric (1892–1958), who was gay. Remembering him, one elderly parishioner commented, "back then we didn't talk about it, but everybody knew and loved him just the same." In the 1960s and 1970s gay men living in Centretown were active members of St. John's. In the mid-1980s when Allen Box was the rector, the AIDS epidemic struck, and gay people and their families came to the church looking for support. Under Allen's direction, a ministry to people with AIDS was begun.

In 1991 Garth Bulmer became the rector of St. John's Church, and he has been an outspoken advocate for gay people. He has been featured in church publications and in the secular press as a strong proponent of the blessing of same-sex relationships by the Church. The parish is frequently associated with this issue because it actively and publicly support the participation of gay people in the Church, and the participation of the Church in the lives of gay people.

While not a direct ministry of the parish, The Well is an Anglican Community Ministry. It offers a drop-in day program open to all women and their children. The Well enhances each woman's ability to function independently in the community, to the best of her capabilities, through the use a facility, practical services and support. The Well is housed at St. John's and supported by parishioners and clergy.
