= Grand-Zattry =

Grand-Zattry Zadieguhé
- Town, sub-prefecture, and commune
- Location in Ivory Coast
- Coordinates: 6°7′N 6°32′W
- Country: Ivory Coast
- District: Bas-Sassandra
- Region: Nawa
- Department: Soubré

Area
  - Total: 1,040 km^{2} (400 sq mi)

Population (2021 census)
  - Total: 112,049
  - Density: 108/km^{2} (279/sq mi)
  - Town: 24,166
- (2014 census)
- Time zone: UTC+0 (GMT)

Grand-Zattry (also known as Zadieguhé) is a town in south-western Ivory Coast. It is a sub-prefecture and commune of Soubré Department in Nawa Region, Bas-Sassandra District.

In 2021, the population of the sub-prefecture of Grand-Zattry was 112,049.

== Villages ==
The twenty four villages of the sub-prefecture of Grand-Zattry and their population in 2014 are:

1. Bagoliéoua (4 973 )
2. Gabaguhé (3 336 )
3. Blesséoua (2 892 )
4. Grand-Zattry (24 166 )
5. Kipiri (2 418 )
6. Kotabliéoua (1 843 )
7. Gadago (2 806 )
8. Gbaléguhé (1 193 )
9. Gbaléville (2 523 )
10. Gbazoa (3 136 )
11. Gbisso (2 073 )
12. Gouabouo 1 (1 879)
13. Koréguhé (4 965 )
14. Mahiéoua (2 988 )
15. Mavou (1 913 )
16. Ouréyo (4 450 )
17. Pétigoa 1 (4 215)
18. Pétigoa 2 (8 481)
19. Roa (5 420 )
20. Séribouo (830 )
21. Sokozoa (2 253 )
22. Zadieguhe (1 033 )
23. Zakoéoua (4 539 )
24. Zougouzoa (5 018 )
