= Enteromius pobeguini =

Conservation status
- Least Concern (IUCN 3.1)

Scientific classification
- Kingdom: Animalia
- Phylum: Chordata
- Class: Actinopterygii
- Order: Cypriniformes
- Family: Cyprinidae
- Subfamily: Smiliogastrinae
- Genus: Enteromius
- Species: E. pobeguini

Binomial name
- Enteromius pobeguini Pellegrin, 1911

Synonyms
- Afropuntio pobeguini (Pellegrin, 1911); Barbus mirei Estève, 1952; Barbus pobeguini Pellegrin, 1911; Barbus pobeguini mauritanica Pellegrin, 1937; Barbus pobeguini pobeguini Pellegrin, 1911; Hemigrammocapoeta mirei (Estève, 1952)

Species of fish

Enteromius pobeguini is a species of ray-finned fish in the genus Enteromius from the Sudanian basins of Niger, Senegal, Gambia and Volta Rivers; also found in certain coastal basins like Comoé, Bandama and Sassandra Rivers in Côte d'Ivoire, and Tominé River in Guinea, Adrar Mountains in Mauritania and Bandingara Plateau in Mali.
