= Buyo Dam =

Dam in Ivory Coast

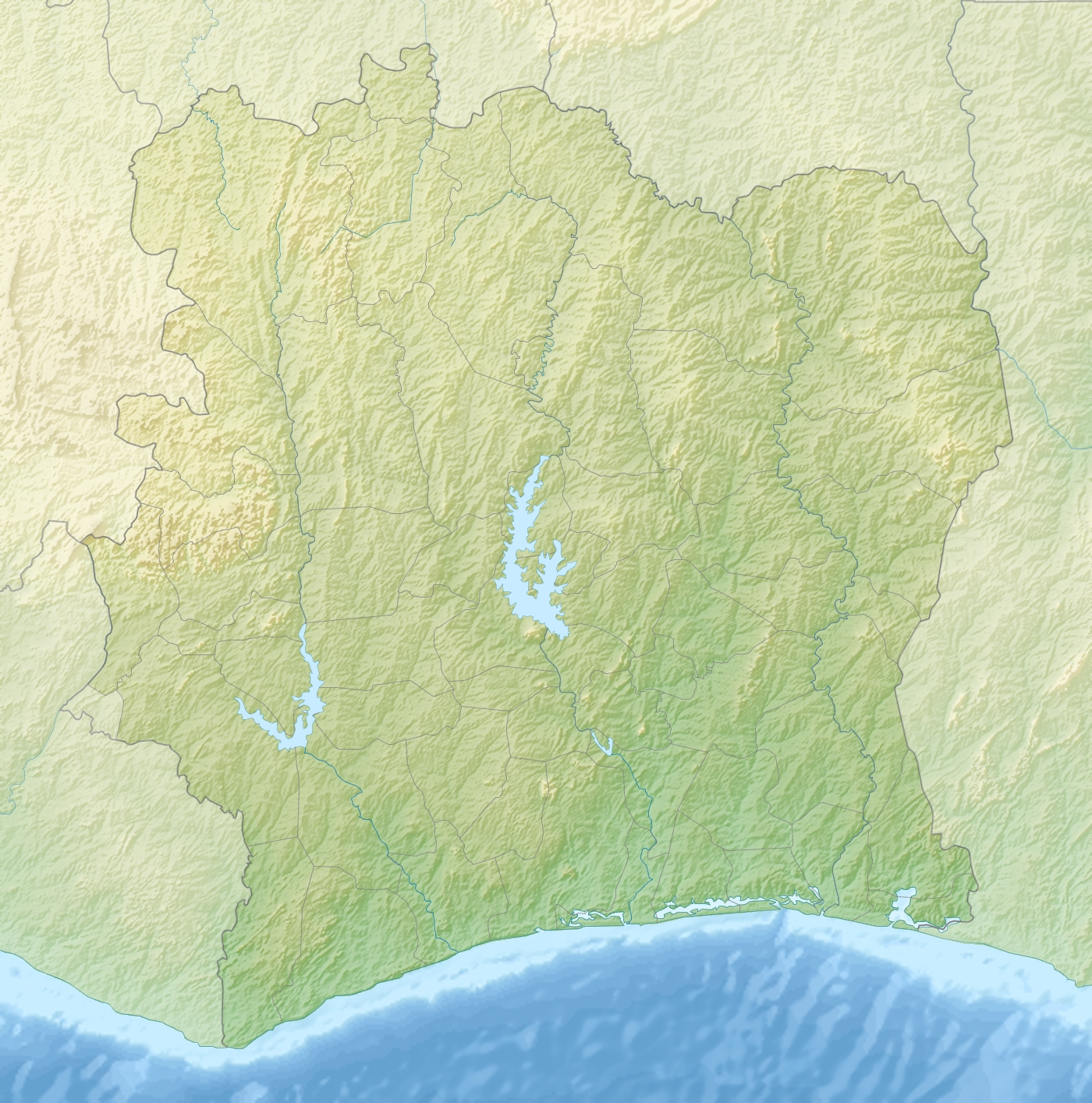
- Location within Ivory Coast
- Interactive map of Buyo Dam
- Country: Ivory Coast
- Coordinates: 6°14′28.50″N 7°02′00.32″W
- Purpose: Power
- Status: Operational
- Opening date: 1980
- Owner: Ministry of Economy

Dam and spillways
- Type of dam: Embankment, earth and rock-fill
- Impounds: Sassandra River
- Height: 37 m (121 ft)
- Length: 3,615 m (11,860 ft)

Reservoir
- Creates: Lake Buyo
- Total capacity: 8,300×10^{6} m^{3} (6,700,000 acre⋅ft)
- Catchment area: 46,000 km^{2} (18,000 sq mi)
- Surface area: 89.5 km^{2} (34.6 sq mi)

Power Station
- Commission date: 1980-1981
- Turbines: 3 × 55 MW (74,000 hp) Kaplan-type
- Installed capacity: 165 MW (221,000 hp)

The Buyo Dam is an embankment dam on the Sassandra River in the Bas-Sassandra district of Côte d'Ivoire. Completed in 1980, it has a hydroelectric power station with an installed capacity of 165 megawatts (221,000 hp), enough to power over 111,000 homes.
