= Dapéoua =

- Town and sub-prefecture
- Location in Ivory Coast
- Coordinates: 6°9′N 6°52′W
- Country: Ivory Coast
- District: Bas-Sassandra
- Region: Nawa
- Department: Buyo

Population (2014)
  - Total: 80,658
- Time zone: UTC+0 (GMT)

Dapéoua is a town in south-western Ivory Coast. It is a sub-prefecture of Buyo Department in Nawa Region, Bas-Sassandra District.

The south-western third of the sub-prefecture is located in Taï National Park.

Dapéoua was a commune until March 2012, when it became one of 1,126 communes nationwide that were abolished.

In 2014, the population of the sub-prefecture of Dapéoua was 80,658.

== Villages ==
The nine villages of the sub-prefecture of Dapéoua and their population in 2014 are:

1. Belleville (14,530)
2. Dapéoua (10,758)
3. Gnagboya V4 (7,158)
4. Gribouo (5,215)
5. Kodaya (6,543)
6. Lobogba (10,498)
7. Loboville (12,348)
8. Sagboya (7,072)
9. Trawaininkro (6,536)
