= Bas-Sassandra Region =

Coordinates: 5°30′N 6°40′W

Bas-Sassandra Region Région du Bas-Sassandra
- Defunct region of Ivory Coast
- 1997–2011
- Location of Bas-Sassandra Region in Ivory Coast
- Capital: San-Pédro
- Area
- 26,440 km^{2} (10,210 sq mi)
- History
  - Established as a first-level subdivision: 1997
  - Disestablished: 2011
- Today part of: Nawa (all), San-Pédro (all), and Gbôklé (part) regions

Bas-Sassandra Region is a defunct region of Ivory Coast. From 1997 to 2011, it was a first-level subdivision region. The region's capital was San-Pédro and its area was 26,440 km^{2}. Since 2011, the area formerly encompassed by the region is part of Bas-Sassandra District.

== Departments ==
At the time of its dissolution, Bas-Sassandra Region was divided into six departments: Fresco, Guéyo, San-Pédro, Sassandra, Soubré, and Tabou.

== Abolition ==
Bas-Sassandra Region was abolished as part of the 2011 administrative reorganisation of the subdivisions of Ivory Coast. The area formerly encompassed by the region was combined with Fresco Department—which was carved off from Sud-Bandama Region—to create Bas-Sassandra District.
