= Buyo Department =

Coordinates: 6°14′N 7°3′W

Buyo Department Département de Buyo
- Department
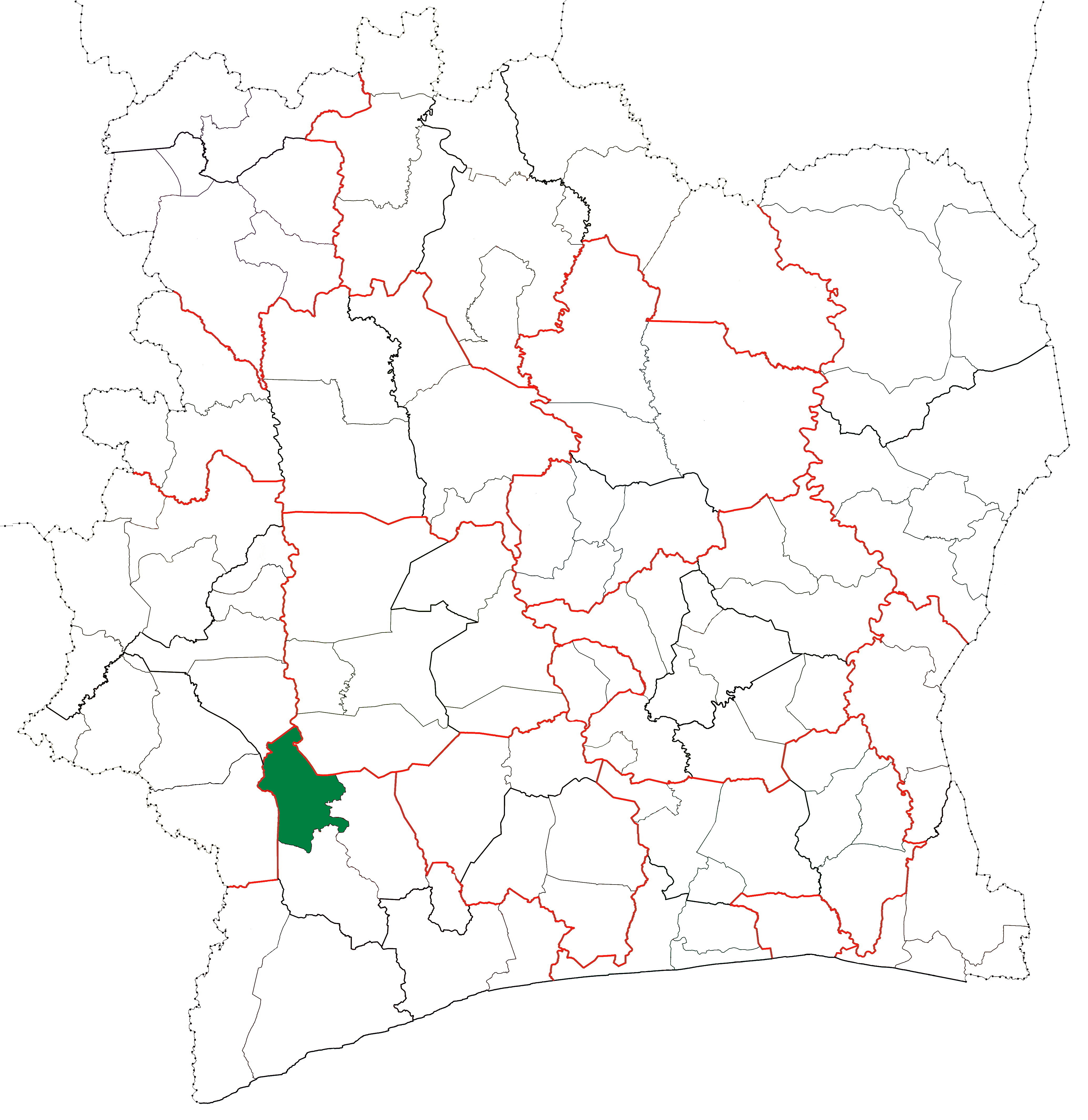
- Location in Ivory Coast. Buyo Department has retained the same boundaries since its creation in 2012.
- Country: Ivory Coast
- District: Bas-Sassandra
- Region: Nawa
- 2012: Established via a division of Soubré Dept
- Departmental seat: Buyo

Government
  - Prefect: Achille Djé Bi Djé

Area
  - Total: 2,370 km^{2} (920 sq mi)

Population (2021 census)
  - Total: 176,568
  - Density: 74.5/km^{2} (193/sq mi)
- Time zone: UTC+0 (GMT)

Buyo Department is a department of Nawa Region in Bas-Sassandra District, Ivory Coast. In 2021, its population was 176,568 and its seat is the settlement of Buyo. The sub-prefectures of the department are Buyo and Dapéoua.

== History ==
Buyo Department and Méagui Department were created in 2012 by dividing Soubré Department.
