= Dahiri =

Dahiri may refer to:

- Sindhi people
- Dahiri, Ivory Coast
