= Outaouais (disambiguation) =

Outaouais is a region of Quebec, Canada.

Outaouais may also refer to:

- The French name for the Ottawa River, a large river in Ontario and Quebec, Canada
- The French name for the indigenous Odawa people, namesakes of the river and several other places in North America
