= Méagui =

- City, sub-prefecture, and commune
- Location in Ivory Coast
- Coordinates: 5°24′N 6°34′W
- Country: Ivory Coast
- District: Bas-Sassandra
- Region: Nawa
- Department: Méagui

Area
  - Total: 682 km^{2} (263 sq mi)

Population (2021 census)
  - Total: 153,483
  - Density: 225/km^{2} (583/sq mi)
  - City: 57,367
- (2014 census)
- Time zone: UTC+0 (GMT)

Méagui is a city in south-western Ivory Coast. It is a sub-prefecture of and the seat of Méagui Department in Nawa Region, Bas-Sassandra District. Méagui is also a commune.

In 2021, the population of the sub-prefecture of Méagui was 153,483.

== Villages ==
The villages of the sub-prefecture of Méagui and their population in 2014 are:

1. Abodagui (1 402 )
2. Ahoutouagui (3 406 )
3. Blagbanié (2 086 )
4. Gbogbo (1 685 )
5. Gnititoigui 1 (4 524 )
6. Gnititoigui 2 (3 288 )
7. Koffiagui (1 559 )
8. Krohon (2 644 )
9. Méagui (57 367 )
10. Négréagui (1 805 )
11. Polo (1 141 )
12. Téréagui 1 (858 )
13. Téréagui 2 (1 486 )
14. Touagui 1 (7 488 )
15. Amoragui (1 409 )
16. Bagui (2 098 )
17. Kouadioagui (796 )
18. Kouaméagui (1 604 )
19. Kragui (6 628 )
20. N'guessangui (1 109 )
21. Pogréagui (11 924 )
22. Sakiaré (3 006 )
23. Tagba (1 883 )
24. Tagboagui (798 )
25. Touagui 2 (5 383 )
26. Touanié 1 (3 571 )
27. Yobouéagui (1 346 )
