= Ottawa micropolitan area =

Ottawa micropolitan area may refer to:

- Ottawa, IL Micropolitan Statistical Area, United States
- Franklin County, Kansas comprises the Ottawa micropolitan area

== See also ==
- Ottawa metropolitan area
- Ottawa (disambiguation)
