= Enteromius baudoni =

Conservation status
- Least Concern (IUCN 3.1)

Scientific classification
- Kingdom: Animalia
- Phylum: Chordata
- Class: Actinopterygii
- Order: Cypriniformes
- Family: Cyprinidae
- Genus: Enteromius
- Species: E. baudoni

Binomial name
- Enteromius baudoni (Boulenger, 1918)

Synonyms
- Barbus baudoni (Boulenger 1918); Barbus svenssoni Barbus voltae

Species of fish

Enteromius baudoni is a species of tropical cyprinid freshwater fish from central and western Africa. It is found in western Africa, in the river basins of the Chad Basin, the Volta basin, the Niger River basin, the Gambia River basin, the Senegal River basin, the Sassandra River basin, and the Bandama River basin. In central Africa, it is found in the Ubangui River ecosystem. It typically inhabits tropical freshwater ecosystems between 24 and 26 °C (75 and 79 °F). It was originally described by Belgian-British zoologist George Albert Boulenger as Barbus baudoni in 1918, and the holotype, collected from Bangui, Central African Republic, is stored at the Muséum national d'Histoire naturelle in Paris. The species was originally classified in the Barbus genus, but was reclassified as belonging to the Enteromius genus in 2015 after examining extensive taxon, geographical, and genomic sampling of the species in the family Cyprinidae.

The fish grows to 3.3 cm (1.3 in) standard length and many specimens contain 3 small spots that are aligned on the middle of the sides of the fish. These spots are frequently linked with a distinct longitudinal band. The caudal fin is forked and the fish has two pairs of barbels.

Enteromius baudoni are benthopelagic, potamodromous fish that are harvested for human consumption. Deforestation is a threat to the species, because it causes increased accumulation of silt in their ecosystem. The species was evaluated in 2009, and found to be of Least Concern by the International Union for Conservation of Nature and Natural Resources.

The fish was named in honor of French colonial administrator Alfred Baudon, who sent the British Museum (Natural History) his collection of fishes from the Shari River, including the type specimen of this fish.
