= Synodontis velifer =

Conservation status
- Least Concern (IUCN 3.1)

Scientific classification
- Domain: Eukaryota
- Kingdom: Animalia
- Phylum: Chordata
- Class: Actinopterygii
- Order: Siluriformes
- Family: Mochokidae
- Genus: Synodontis
- Species: S. velifer

Binomial name
- Synodontis velifer Norman, 1935

Species of fish

Synodontis velifer is a species of upside-down catfish native to Burkina Faso, Ivory Coast and Ghana where it can be found in the Pra River and the Sassandra, Bandama and Volta basins. This species grows to a length of 23.8 centimetres (9.4 in) TL.
