= Ottawa metropolitan area (disambiguation) =

The Ottawa metropolitan area is the metropolitan area also known as the National Capital Region encompassing the capital of Canada.

The Ottawa metropolitan area may also refer to:

- The Ottawa, Illinois micropolitan area, United States
- The Ottawa, Kansas micropolitan area, United States

== See also ==
- Ottawa (disambiguation)
