= Buyo, Ivory Coast =

Buyo
- Town, sub-prefecture, and commune
- Location in Ivory Coast
- Coordinates: 6°14′N 7°3′W
- Country: Ivory Coast
- District: Bas-Sassandra
- Region: Nawa
- Department: Buyo

Area
  - Total: 1,290 km^{2} (500 sq mi)

Population (2021 census)
  - Total: 100,848
  - Density: 78.2/km^{2} (202/sq mi)
  - Town: 25,339
- (2014 census)
- Time zone: UTC+0 (GMT)

Buyo is a town in south-western Ivory Coast. It is a sub-prefecture of and the seat of Buyo Department in Nawa Region, Bas-Sassandra District. Buyo is also a commune. The city sits on the south shore of Lake Buyo.

The far southern portion of the sub-prefecture is located in Taï National Park.

In 2021, the population of the sub-prefecture of Buyo was 100,848.

== Villages ==
The villages of the sub-prefecture of Buyo and their population in 2014 are:

1. Assamoikro (4 104 )
2. Buyo (25 339 )
3. Gbily (3 997 )
4. Logbozoua (5 341 )
5. Mayakoffikro (5 804 )
6. Adk (Complexe Industriel) (2 771)
7. Baglo 2 (5 097 )
8. Dafrahinou (10 150 )
9. Gbliglo (10 403 )
10. Koréahinou (9 948 )
11. Noukpoudou 2 (4 803 )
12. Tchétaly (8 994 )
13. Wonséaly (6 466 )
