= Ottawa (disambiguation) =

Ottawa is a city in the province of Ontario and the capital of Canada.

Ottawa may also refer to:

== Places ==
=== Canada ===
- Ottawa (City of) (electoral district), a historical electoral district in Ontario
- Ottawa (County of) (electoral district), a historical electoral district in Quebec
- Ottawa (Ontario provincial electoral district), an electoral district from 1867 to 1908
- Ottawa (Quebec provincial electoral district), an electoral district from 1867 to 1919
- Ottawa Islands, islands on the east coast of Hudson Bay
- Ottawa River, in Ontario and Quebec
  - Ottawa Valley, the valley of the Ottawa river.

=== United States ===
- Ottawa, Illinois, a city
- Ottawa, Kansas, a city
- Ottawa, Minnesota, an unincorporated community
- Ottawa, Ohio, a village
- Ottawa, Wisconsin, a town
- Ottawa River (Lake Erie), in Michigan and Ohio in the United States, which drains into Lake Erie
- Ottawa River (Auglaize River tributary), in Ohio, United States

=== Elsewhere ===
- Ottawa, Ivory Coast, a village
- Ottawa, KwaZulu-Natal, a suburb of Durban, KwaZulu-Natal, South Africa

== Ships ==
- HMCS Ottawa (H60), a C-class destroyer that served with the Royal Canadian Navy from 1938 to 1942
- HMCS Ottawa (H31), a G-class destroyer that served with the Royal Canadian Navyfrom 1943 to 1945
- HMCS Ottawa (DDH 229), a St. Laurent-class destroyer that served in the Royal Canadian Navy from 1956 to 1992
- HMCS Ottawa (FFH 341), a Halifax-class frigate commissioned in 1996
- SS Ottawa, a steamship that was once the SS Germanic
- Ottawa (shipwreck), a tugboat that sank in Lake Superior
- Ottawa, a tanker built in 1964 by Swan Hunter

== Other uses ==
- Government of Canada, as a metonym
- Odawa or Ottawa, a First Nation/Native American ethnic group
  - Ottawa dialect, their language
- Ottawa Tribe of Oklahoma, a federally recognized tribe in the United States
- Ottawa Hockey Club, Ottawa, Ontario, Canada; also known as the "Ottawas", a hockey team
- Altoona Mountain Citys, Altoona, Pennsylvania, USA; also known as the "Ottawas", a baseball team

== See also ==
- Grand Traverse Band of Ottawa and Chippewa Indians, a federally recognized tribe in the United States
- HMCS Ottawa, a list of Canadian warships
- Ottawa County (disambiguation)
- Ottawa Township (disambiguation)
- Ottawa Treaty, a treaty first signed in 1997 that bans anti-personnel landmines
- Ottawa Charter for Health Promotion, a document signed at a 1987 World Health Organization convention
- Otawa, a rural area in the Bay of Plenty region of New Zealand
- Ottawan, a disco group
