= Sud-Bandama =

Coordinates: 5°40′N 5°30′W

Sud-Bandama Region Région du Sud-Bandama
- Defunct region of Ivory Coast
- 1997–2011
- Location of Sud-Bandama Region in Ivory Coast
- Capital: Divo
- Area
- 10,667 km^{2} (4,119 sq mi)
- History
  - Established as a first-level subdivision: 1997
  - Disestablished: 2011
- Today part of: Lôh-Djiboua (all) and Gbôklé (part) regions

Sud-Bandama Region is a defunct region of Ivory Coast. From 1997 to 2011, it was a first-level subdivision region. The region's capital was Divo and its area was 10,677 km². Since 2011, the area formerly encompassed by the region is divided between Bas-Sassandra and Gôh-Djiboua Districts.

== Departments ==
At the time of its dissolution, Sud-Bandama Region was divided into three departments: Divo, Guitry, and Lakota.

== Abolition ==
Sud-Bandama Region was abolished as part of the 2011 administrative reorganisation of the subdivisions of Ivory Coast. The area formerly encompassed by the region is divided between Bas-Sassandra and Gôh-Djiboua Districts. Fresco Department—which was carved out of Divo Department at the reorganisation—was combined with the former Bas-Sassandra Region to create Bas-Sassandra District. The remaining territory of Sud-Bandama became Lôh-Djiboua Region, one of two regions in Gôh-Djiboua District.
