= Ottawa Township =

Ottawa Township may refer to:

- Ottawa Township, LaSalle County, Illinois
- Ottawa Township, Franklin County, Kansas
- Ottawa Township, Ottawa County, Kansas, in Ottawa County, Kansas
- Ottawa Township, Le Sueur County, Minnesota
- Ottawa Township, Allen County, Ohio
- Ottawa Township, Putnam County, Ohio
