= Liliyo =

Liliyo Liliy
- Town and sub-prefecture
- Location in Ivory Coast
- Coordinates: 6°0′N 6°21′W
- Country: Ivory Coast
- District: Bas-Sassandra
- Region: Nawa
- Department: Soubré

Population (2014)
  - Total: 76,682
- Time zone: UTC+0 (GMT)

Liliyo (also spelled Liliy) is a town in south-western Ivory Coast. It is a sub-prefecture of Soubré Department in Nawa Region, Bas-Sassandra District.

Liliyo was a commune until March 2012, when it became one of 1,126 communes nationwide that were abolished.

In 2014, the population of the sub-prefecture of Liliyo was 76,682.

== Villages ==
The seventeen villages of the sub-prefecture of Liliyo and their population in 2014 are:

1. Mayo (9,303)
2. Bricolo (5,316)
3. Bakayo (3,437)
4. Gnapayo (1,561)
5. Gnogboyo (9,729)
6. Koda-Centre (1,647)
7. Koméayo (1,067)
8. Koziayo 1 (3,993)
9. Koziayo 2 (2,851)
10. Lessiri (9,252)
11. Liliyo (6,238)
12. Moussayo (6,552)
13. Neneféyoroua (1,734)
14. Ouregbabre (3,008)
15. Sayo (1,102)
16. Yacolidabouo (2,822)
17. Yacolo (7,070)
