= Fresco Department =

Coordinates: 5°5′N 5°34′W

Fresco Department Département de Fresco
- Department
- Location in Ivory Coast. Fresco Department has retained the same boundaries since its creation in 2008.
- Country: Ivory Coast
- District: Bas-Sassandra
- Region: Gbôklé
- 2008: Established as a second-level subdivision via division of Divo Dept
- 2011: Converted to a third-level subdivision
- Departmental seat: Fresco

Government
  - Prefect: Konan Djézou

Area
  - Total: 1,860 km^{2} (720 sq mi)

Population (2021 census)
  - Total: 107,752
  - Density: 57.9/km^{2} (150/sq mi)
- Time zone: UTC+0 (GMT)

Fresco Department is a department of Gbôklé Region in Bas-Sassandra District, Ivory Coast. In 2021, its population was 107,752 and its seat is the settlement of Fresco. The sub-prefectures of the department are Dahiri, Fresco and Gbagbam.

== History ==
Fresco Department was created in 2008 as a second-level subdivision via a split-off from Divo Department. At its creation, it was part of Sud-Bandama Region.

In 2011, districts were introduced as new first-level subdivisions of Ivory Coast. At the same time, regions were reorganised and became second-level subdivisions and all departments were converted into third-level subdivisions. At this time, Fresco Department became part of Gbôklé Region in Bas-Sassandra District. (Fresco Department was combined with Bas-Sassandra Region to create Bas-Sassandra District.)
