= Lake Buyo =

Lake in Ivory Coast

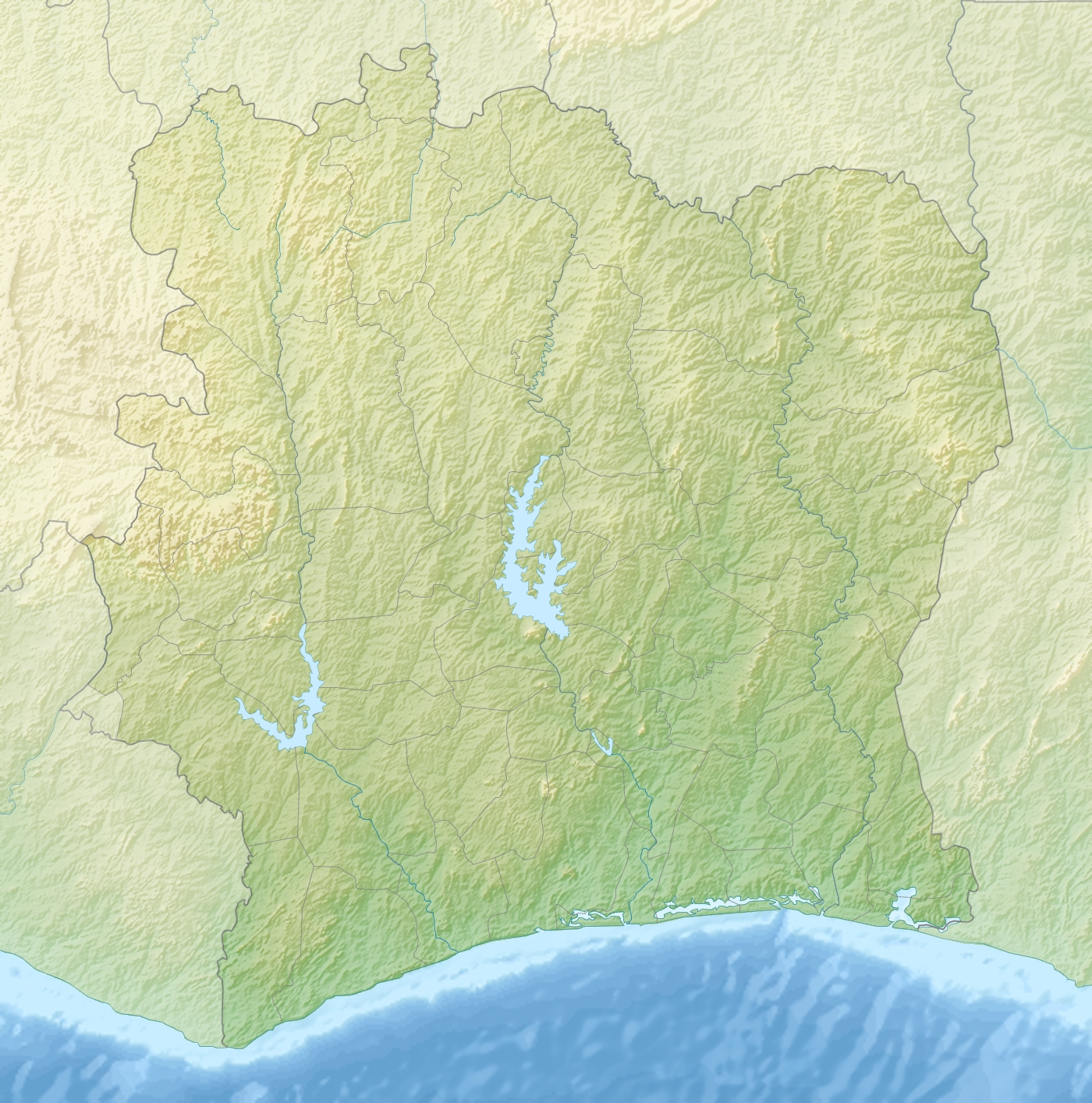
- Location within Ivory Coast
- Location: Buyo, Ivory Coast
- Coordinates: 6.3°N 7.1°W
- Basin countries: Ivory Coast

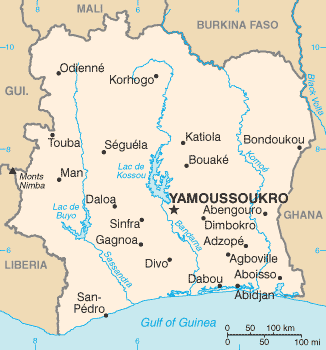
Map of the Ivory Coast showing Lake Buyo in the west of the country

Lake Buyo (French: Lac de Buyo) is an artificial lake in western Ivory Coast on the Sassandra River. It was formed by the construction of the Buyo Dam at Buyo in 1980.

The water quality of the lake has suffered from disposal of untreated effluents and overuse of fertilizers in the surrounding areas.
