= Okrouyo =

- Town and sub-prefecture
- Location in Ivory Coast
- Coordinates: 5°46′N 6°24′W
- Country: Ivory Coast
- District: Bas-Sassandra
- Region: Nawa
- Department: Soubré

Population (2014)
  - Total: 76,682
- Time zone: UTC+0 (GMT)

Okrouyo is a town in southwestern Ivory Coast. It is a sub-prefecture of Soubré Department in Nawa Region, Bas-Sassandra District.

Okrouyo was a commune until March 2012, when it became one of 1,126 communes nationwide that were abolished.

In 2014, the population of the sub-prefecture of Okrouyo was 113,366.

== Villages ==
The twenty one villages of the sub-prefecture of Okrouyo and their population in 2014 are:

1. Bogréko (4,208)
2. Doboko (1,199)
3. Dobouo (11,384)
4. Dogabre (466)
5. Gbalébouo (5,542)
6. Gblihio (1,885)
7. Gragbazo (1,062)
8. Grébouo 1 (997)
9. Grébouo 2 (7,357)
10. Guiméyo (3,338)
11. Kagnénako (5,406)
12. Kayo (4,427)
13. Koudouyo (3,515)
14. Kpada (6,597)
15. Mabéhiri 1 (17,909)
16. Mabéhiri 2 (3,747)
17. Okrouyo (12,229)
18. Ottawa (8,167)
19. Oupoyo-Bété (4,287)
20. Tayo (5,620)
21. Zogbodoua (4,024)
