= Guéyo Department =

Coordinates: 5°41′N 6°4′W

Guéyo Department Département de Guéyo
- Department
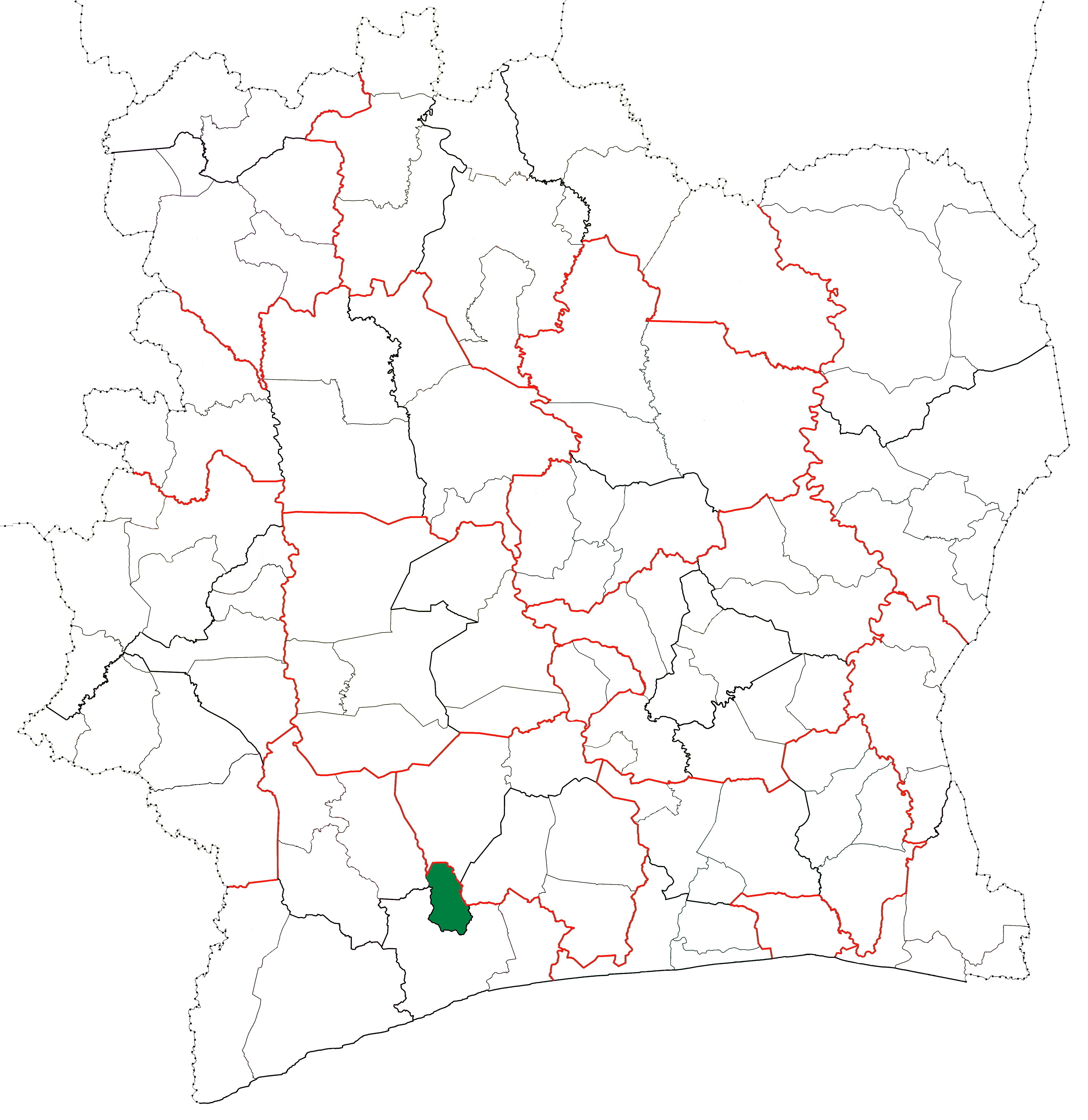
- Location in Ivory Coast. Guéyo Department has retained the same boundaries since its creation in 2008.
- Country: Ivory Coast
- District: Bas-Sassandra
- Region: Nawa
- 2008: Established as a second-level subdivision via division of Sassandra Dept
- 2011: Converted to a third-level subdivision
- Departmental seat: Guéyo

Government
  - Prefect: Kouamé Réné Famy

Area
  - Total: 878 km^{2} (339 sq mi)

Population (2021)
  - Total: 102,213
  - Density: 116/km^{2} (302/sq mi)
- Time zone: UTC+0 (GMT)

Guéyo Department is a department of Nawa Region in Bas-Sassandra District, Ivory Coast. In 2021, its population was 102,213 and its seat is the settlement of Guéyo. The sub-prefectures of the department are Dabouyo and Guéyo.

== History ==
Guéyo Department was created in 2008 as a second-level subdivision via a split-off from Sassandra Department. At its creation, it was part of Bas-Sassandra Region.

In 2011, districts were introduced as new first-level subdivisions of Ivory Coast. At the same time, regions were reorganised and became second-level subdivisions and all departments were converted into third-level subdivisions. At this time, Guéyo Department became part of Nawa Region in Bas-Sassandra District.
