= Méagui Department =

Coordinates: 5°24′N 6°34′W

Méagui Department Département de Méagui
- Department
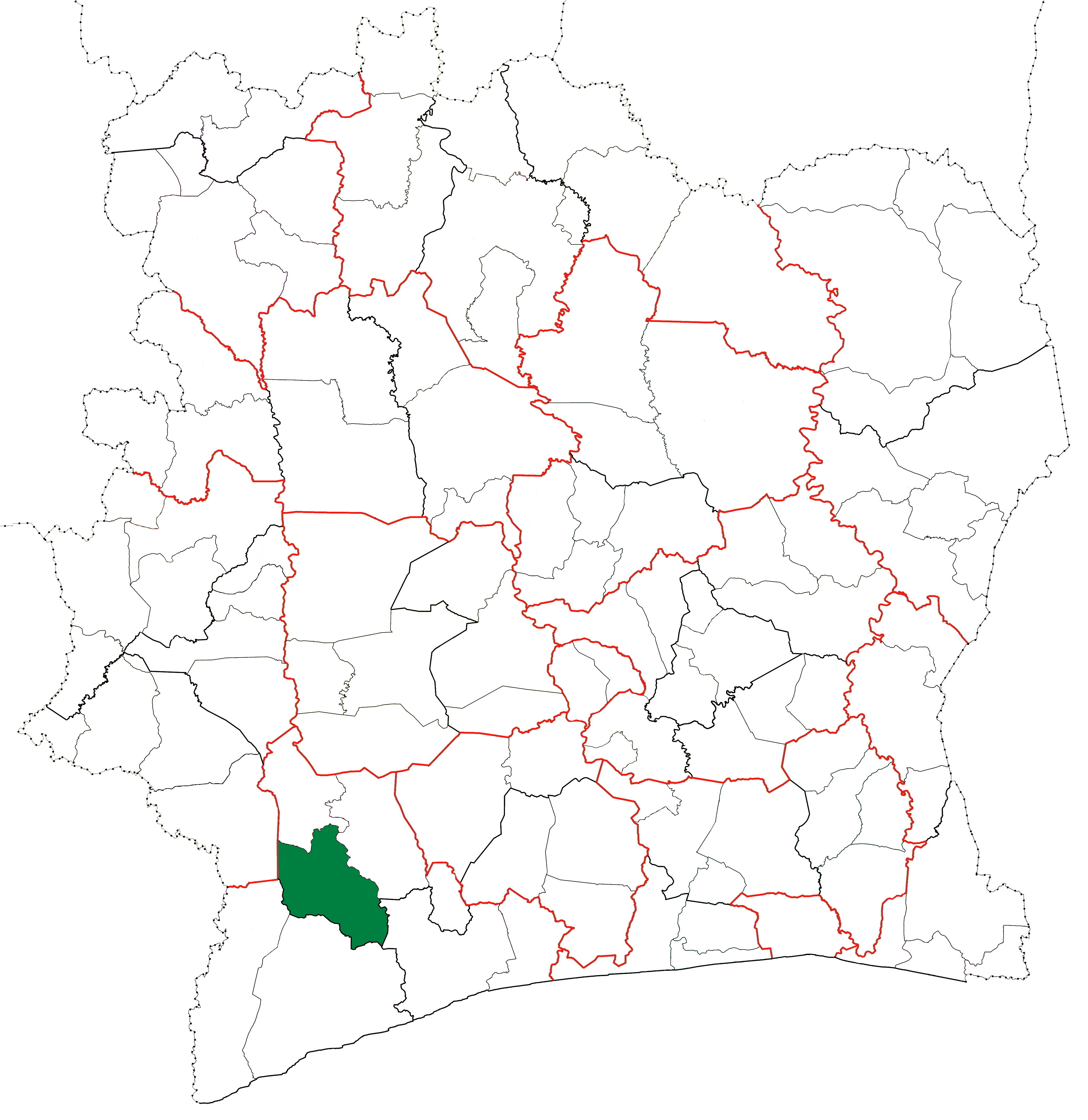
- Location in Ivory Coast. Méagui Department has retained the same boundaries since its creation in 2012.
- Country: Ivory Coast
- District: Bas-Sassandra
- Region: Nawa
- 2012: Established via a division of Soubré Dept
- Departmental seat: Méagui

Government
  - Prefect: Kouakou Pierre Kouassi-Lenoir

Area
  - Total: 3,200 km^{2} (1,200 sq mi)

Population (2021 census)
  - Total: 299,251
  - Density: 94/km^{2} (240/sq mi)
- Time zone: UTC+0 (GMT)

Méagui Department is a department of Nawa Region in Bas-Sassandra District, Ivory Coast. In 2021, its population was 299,251 and its seat is the settlement of Méagui. The sub-prefectures of the department are Gnanmangui, Méagui and Oupoyo.

== History ==
Méagui Department and Buyo Department were created in 2012 by dividing Soubré Department.
