= HMCS Ottawa =

Four Canadian naval units have been named HMCS Ottawa.

- HMCS Ottawa (H60) (I) was a C-class destroyer commissioned as HMS Crusader (H60) in the Royal Navy before serving with the Royal Canadian Navy from 1938–1942.
- HMCS Ottawa (H31) (II) was a G-class destroyer commissioned as HMS Griffin (H31) in the RN before serving with the RCN from 1943–1945.
- HMCS Ottawa (DDH 229) (III) was St. Laurent-class destroyer that served in the RCN and Canadian Forces from 1956–1992.
- HMCS Ottawa (FFH 341) (IV) is a Halifax-class frigate commissioned in 1996.

== Battle honours ==
- Atlantic, 1939–45.
- Normandy, 1944.
- English Channel, 1944.
- Biscay, 1944.
- Arabian Sea
