= Soubré =

- City, sub-prefecture, and commune
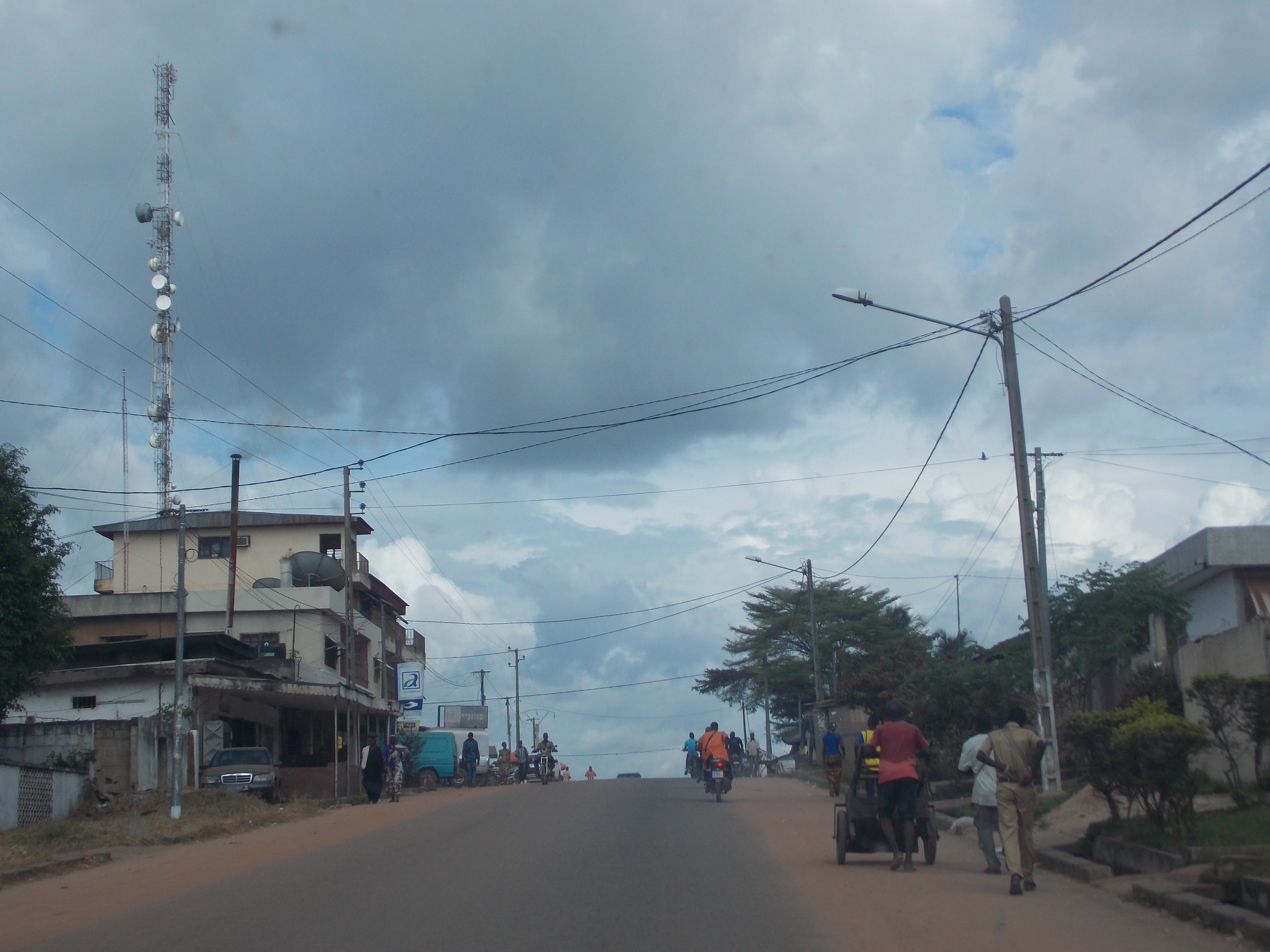

- Location in Ivory Coast
- Coordinates: 5°47′N 6°36′W
- Country: Ivory Coast
- District: Bas-Sassandra
- Region: Nawa
- Department: Soubré

Area
  - Total: 615 km^{2} (237 sq mi)

Population (2021 census)
  - Total: 272,773
  - Density: 444/km^{2} (1,150/sq mi)
  - City: 101,196
- (2014 census)
- Time zone: UTC+0 (GMT)

Soubré is a city in southwestern Ivory Coast. It is a sub-prefecture of and the seat of Soubré Department. It is also a commune and the seat of Nawa Region in Bas-Sassandra District. In the 2014 census, the city had a population of 101,196 and the sub-prefecture a population of 175,163.

== Villages ==
The twenty two villages of the sub-prefecture of Soubré and their population in 2014 are:

1. Galéa 1 (1 313)
2. Galéa 2 (3 454)
3. Gbaléyo (1 935 )
4. Gripazo (2 234 )
5. Guéyo (242 )
6. Kopéragui (1 982 )
7. Kpéhiri (2 432 )
8. Logboayo (2 098 )
9. Mahio (1 618 )
10. Soubouo (2 752 )
11. Soubre (101 196 )
12. Badayo (1 571 )
13. Djoutougbo (3 288 )
14. Kiodja-Tchad (3 052 )
15. Konédougou (10 302 )
16. Koréyo (1 137 )
17. Niapoyo (1 862 )
18. Obrouayo (8 055 )
19. Sayo (1 626 )
20. Tapéyo (793 )
21. Yabayo (20 086 )
22. Zergbeu (2 135 )

== Climate ==
Köppen-Geiger climate classification system classifies its climate as tropical savanna (Aw).

Climate data for Soubré
Month	Jan	Feb	Mar	Apr	May	Jun	Jul	Aug	Sep	Oct	Nov	Dec	Year
Mean daily maximum °C (°F)	31.7 (89.1)	32.4 (90.3)	32.2 (90.0)	32 (90)	31.1 (88.0)	29.3 (84.7)	28.1 (82.6)	27.7 (81.9)	28.6 (83.5)	29.9 (85.8)	30.5 (86.9)	30.6 (87.1)	30.3 (86.7)
Daily mean °C (°F)	26.4 (79.5)	27.2 (81.0)	27.1 (80.8)	27.1 (80.8)	26.6 (79.9)	25.6 (78.1)	24.7 (76.5)	24.4 (75.9)	25 (77)	25.8 (78.4)	26.1 (79.0)	26 (79)	26.0 (78.8)
Mean daily minimum °C (°F)	21.1 (70.0)	22 (72)	22.1 (71.8)	22.3 (72.1)	22.2 (72.0)	22 (72)	21.3 (70.3)	21.2 (70.2)	21.5 (70.7)	21.8 (71.2)	21.8 (71.2)	21.4 (70.5)	21.7 (71.2)
Average rainfall mm (inches)	29 (1.1)	65 (2.6)	128 (5.0)	146 (5.7)	172 (6.8)	223 (8.8)	112 (4.4)	98 (3.9)	198 (7.8)	167 (6.6)	111 (4.4)	54 (2.1)	1,503 (59.2)
Source: Climate-Data.org (altitude: 144 metres or 472 feet)
