= Sassandra River =

River in Ivory Coast

Coordinates: 4.95972°N 6.07722°W

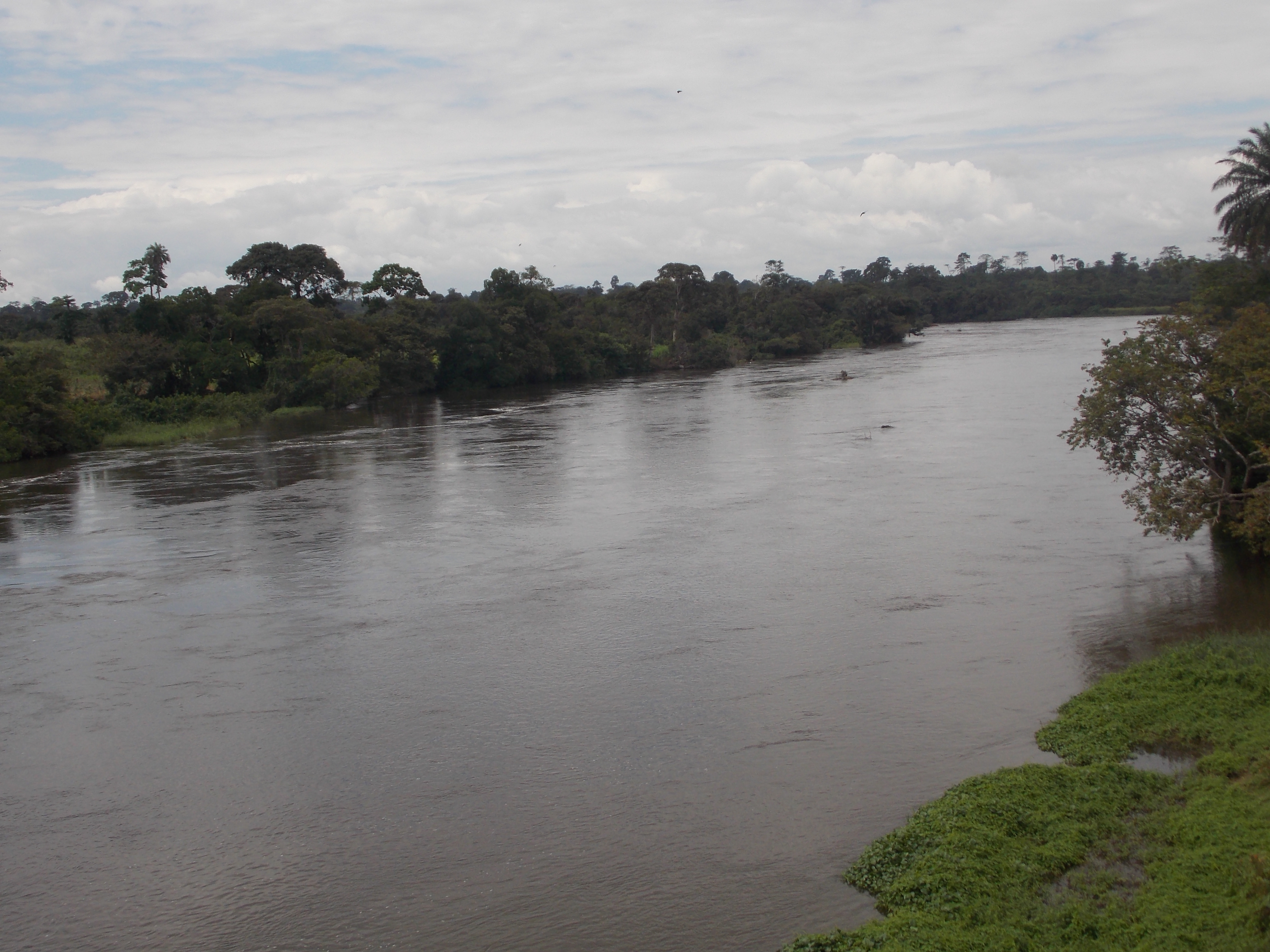

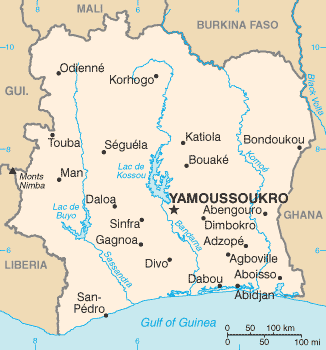
- Map of Ivory Coast showing the Sassandra River in the west part of the country

The Sassandra River is a river of western Ivory Coast in West Africa. It is formed by the confluence of the Tienba River, which originates in the highlands of north-western Ivory Coast, and the Gouan River (also known as the Bafing Sud River), which originates to the west in the highlands of Guinea. The Sassandra flows south-southeast to empty into the Gulf of Guinea on the Atlantic Ocean. The Buyo Dam was constructed across the middle stretch of the river in 1980, just below the confluence with the Nzo River, to create the reservoir called Lake Buyo. The Davo River joins the Sassandra just before it meets the sea. The port town of Sassandra lies on the seacoast where the river meets the sea.

The Sassandra and its tributaries flow through terrestrial ecoregions. The northern, or upper, part of the watershed lies in the Guinean forest-savanna mosaic ecoregion. Further south, it forms the boundary between two tropical moist forest ecoregions, the Western Guinean lowland forests and the Eastern Guinean forests.
