= Gbôklé =

Coordinates: 4°57′N 6°5′W

Gbôklé Region Région du Gbôklé
- Region
- Motto(s): "Gbôklé, la plus belle Région de la Côte d’Ivoire"
- Location of Gbôklé Region in Ivory Coast
- Country: Ivory Coast
- District: Bas-Sassandra
- Established: 2011
- Regional seat: Sassandra

Government
  - Prefect: Ernest Boni Koffi
  - Council President: Dakpa Philippe Legre

Area
  - Total: 6,200 km^{2} (2,400 sq mi)

Population (2021 census)
  - Total: 460,980
  - Density: 74/km^{2} (190/sq mi)
- Time zone: UTC+0 (GMT)

Gbôklé Region is one of the 31 regions of Ivory Coast. Since its establishment in 2011, it has been one of three regions in Bas-Sassandra District. The seat of the region is Sassandra and the region's population in the 2021 census was 460,980.

Gbôklé is currently divided into two departments: Fresco and Sassandra.
