= Soubré Department =

Coordinates: 5°47′N 6°36′W

Soubré Department Département de Soubré
- Department
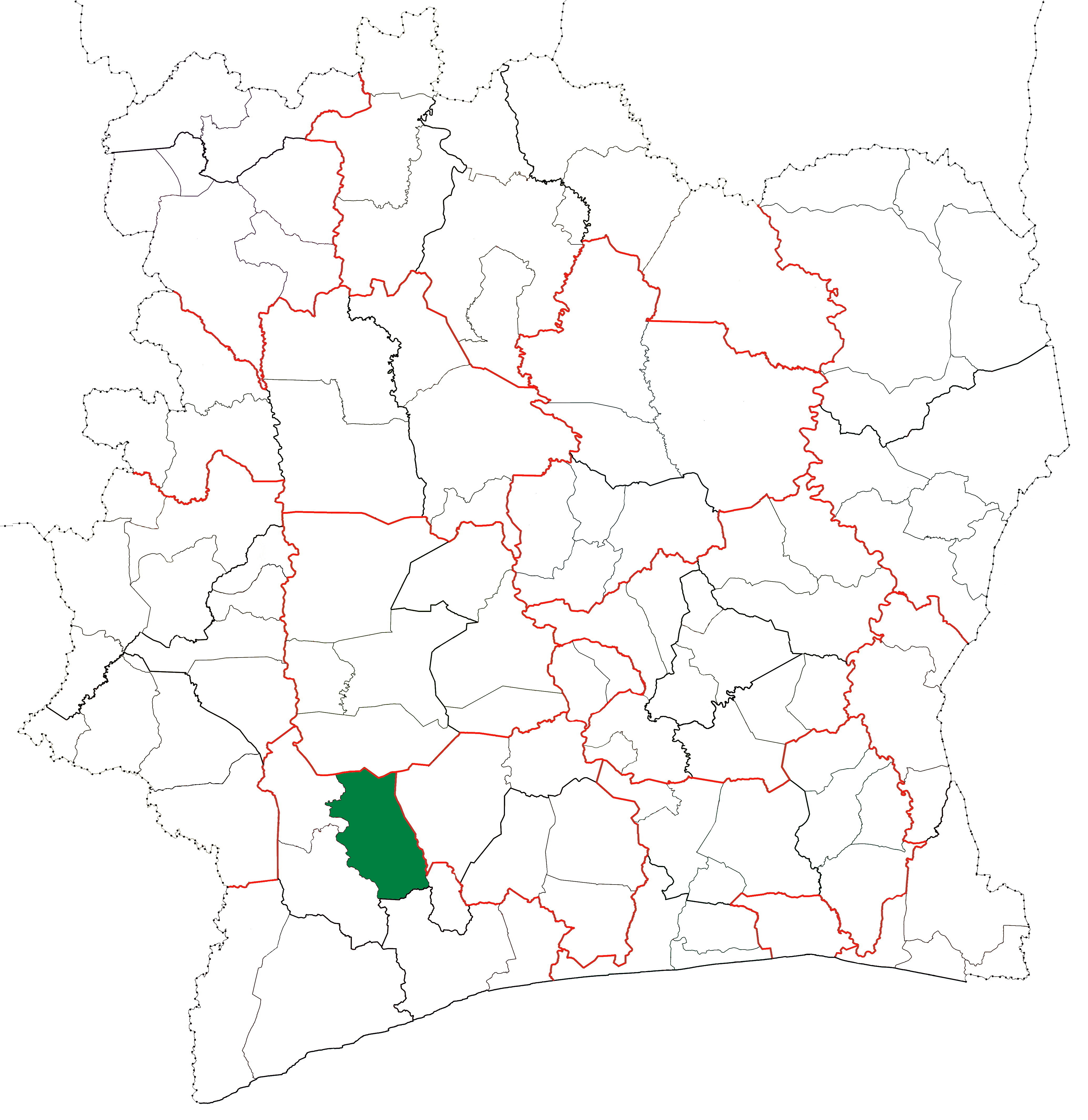
- Location in Ivory Coast. Soubré Department has had these boundaries since 2012.
- Country: Ivory Coast
- District: Bas-Sassandra
- Region: Nawa
- 1980: Established as a first-level subdivision via a division of Sassandra Dept
- 1997: Converted to a second-level subdivision
- 2011: Converted to a third-level subdivision
- 2012: Divided to create Buyo and Méagui Depts
- Departmental seat: Soubré

Government
  - Prefect: Alliali Kouadio

Area
  - Total: 3,300 km^{2} (1,300 sq mi)

Population (2021 census)
  - Total: 587,441
  - Density: 180/km^{2} (460/sq mi)
- Time zone: UTC+0 (GMT)

Soubré Department is a department of Nawa Region in Bas-Sassandra District, Ivory Coast. In 2021, its population was 587,441 and its seat is the settlement of Soubré. The sub-prefectures of the department are Grand-Zattry, Liliyo, Okrouyo, and Soubré.

== History ==
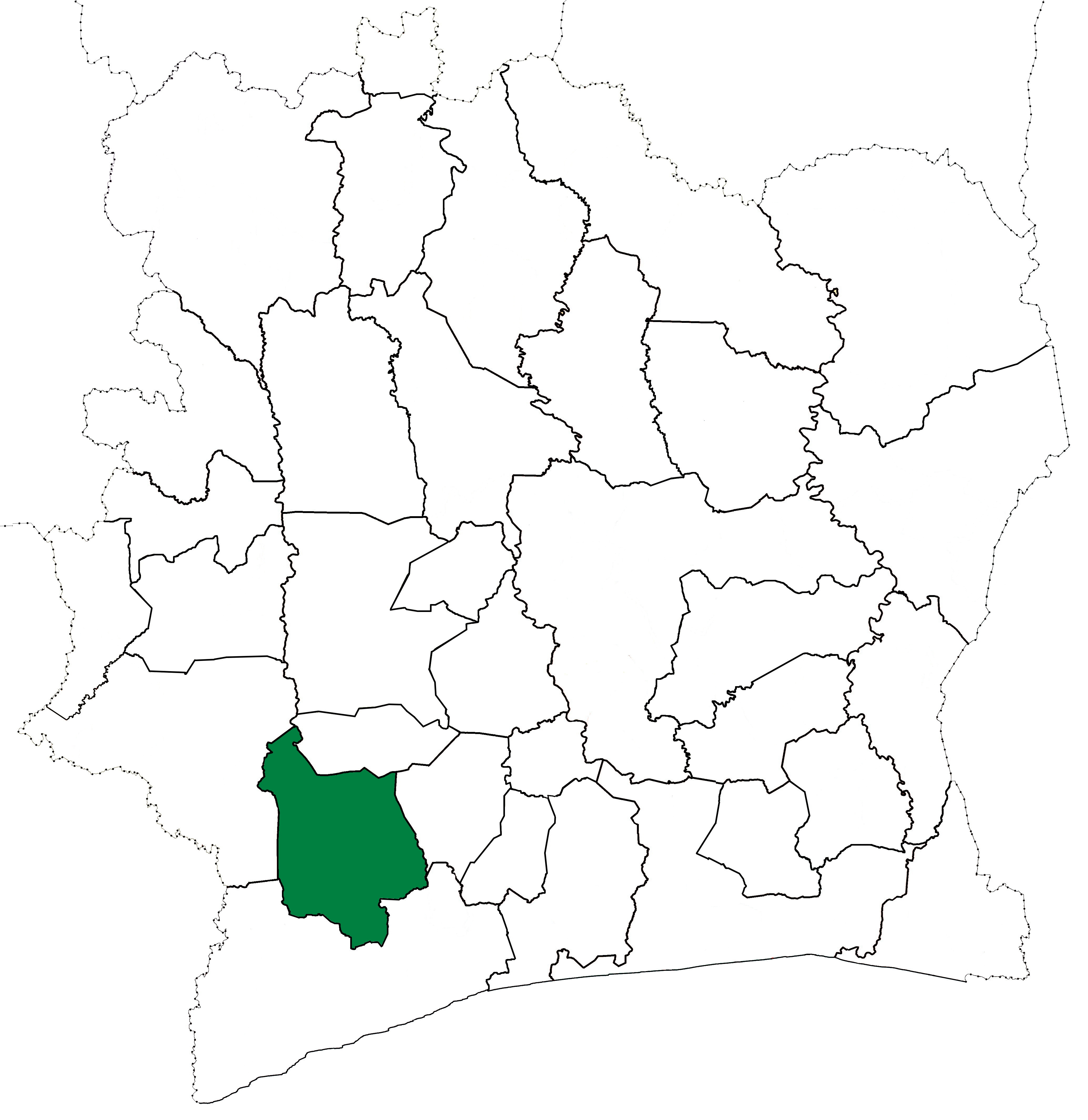
Soubré Department upon its creation in 1980. It kept these boundaries until 2012, but other subdivision boundary changes began to be made in 1988.

Soubré Department was created in 1980 as a split-off from Sassandra Department. Using current boundaries as a reference, from 1980 to 2013 the department occupied the same territory as Nawa Region, with the exception of Guéyo Department.

In 1997, regions were introduced as new first-level subdivisions of Ivory Coast; as a result, all departments were converted into second-level subdivisions. Soubré Department was included in Bas-Sassandra Region.

In 2011, districts were introduced as new first-level subdivisions of Ivory Coast. At the same time, regions were reorganised and became second-level subdivisions and all departments were converted into third-level subdivisions. At this time, Soubré Department became part of Nawa Region in Bas-Sassandra District.

In 2012, four sub-prefectures were split from Soubré Department to create Buyo Department and Méagui Department.
