= Nawa Region =

Coordinates: 5°47′N 6°36′W

Nawa Region Région de la Nawa
- Region
- Seal

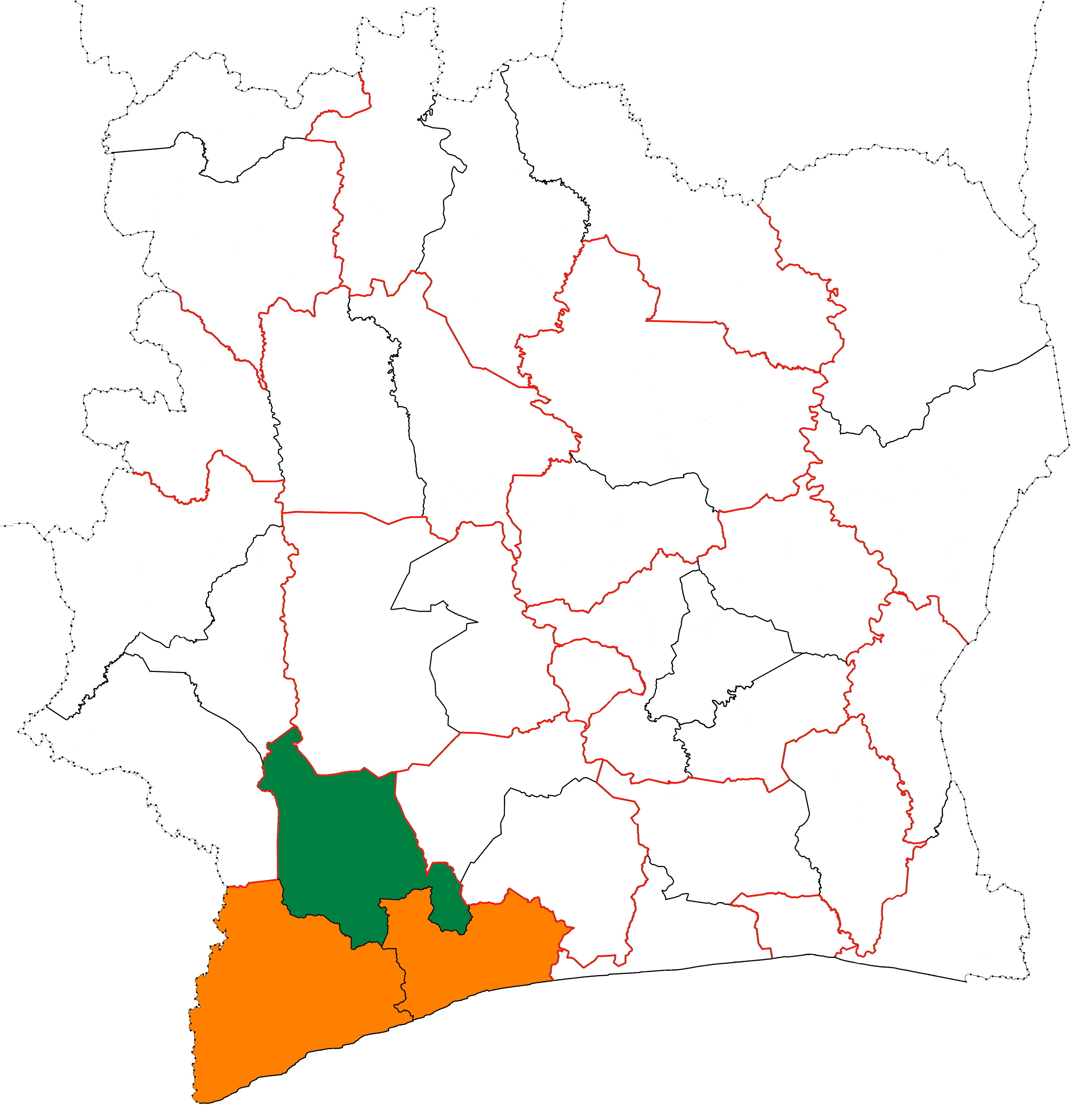
- Location of Nawa Region (green) in Ivory Coast and in Bas-Sassandra District
- Country: Ivory Coast
- District: Bas-Sassandra
- 2011: Established
- Regional seat: Soubré

Government
  - Prefect: Alliali Kouadio
  - Council President: Alain-Richard Donwahi

Area
  - Total: 9,193 km^{2} (3,549 sq mi)

Population (2021 census)
  - Total: 1,165,472
  - Density: 126.8/km^{2} (328.4/sq mi)
- Time zone: UTC+0 (GMT)
- Website: lanawa.ci

Nawa Region is one of the 31 regions of Ivory Coast. Since its establishment in 2011, it has been one of three regions in Bas-Sassandra District. The seat of the region is Soubré and the region's population in the 2021 census was 1,165,472, making it the second-most populous region in Ivory Coast.

Nawa is currently divided into four departments: Buyo, Guéyo, Méagui, and Soubré.
