= Bas-Sassandra District =

District of Ivory Coast

Coordinates: 5°30′N 6°40′W

Bas-Sassandra District District du Bas-Sassandra
- District
- Country: Ivory Coast
- Established: 2011
- Capital: San-Pédro

Area
  - Total: 28,350 km^{2} (10,950 sq mi)

Population (2021 census)
  - Total: 2,687,176
  - Density: 94.79/km^{2} (245.5/sq mi)
- ISO 3166 code: CI-BS
- HDI (2022): 0.520 low · 8th of 14

Bas-Sassandra District (French: District du Bas-Sassandra; [ba.sa.sɑ̃d.ʁa], "Lower Sassandra") is one of fourteen administrative districts of Ivory Coast. The district is located in the southwest part of the country. The capital of the district is San-Pédro.

== Creation ==
The district was created in a 2011 administrative reorganisation of the subdivisions of Ivory Coast. Its territory is composed of the former region of Bas-Sassandra with the addition of the department of Fresco, which was transferred from the region of Sud-Bandama.

== Administrative divisions ==
Bas-Sassandra District is currently subdivided into three regions and the following departments:

- Gbôklé Region (region seat in Sassandra)
  - Fresco Department
  - Sassandra Department
- Nawa Region (region seat in Soubré)
  - Buyo Department
  - Guéyo Department
  - Méagui Department
  - Soubré Department
- San-Pédro Region (region seat also in San-Pédro)
  - San-Pédro Department
  - Tabou Department

== Population ==
According to the 2021 census, Bas-Sassandra District has a population of 2,687,176.

=== Religion ===
Religion in Bas-Sassandra (2021 census)
| Religion | Percent |
| Christianity | 44.2% |
| Islam | 43.6% |
| None | 8.3% |
| Traditional | 1.0% |
| Other | 2.9% |

Bas-Sassandra has a religiously diverse population. According to the 2021 census, Christianity is the plurality religion in the district (44.2%), followed closely by Islam (43.6%) and those with no religion (8.3%). A smaller share of residents adhere to traditional religions or other faiths.
