= Districts of Ivory Coast =

Districts of Ivory Coast Districts de Côte d'Ivoire (French)
- Location: Ivory Coast
- Number: 14 Autonomous Districts
- Subdivisions: Regions

The districts of Ivory Coast (French: districts de Côte d’Ivoire) are the first-level administrative subdivisions of the country. The districts were created in 2011 in an effort to further decentralise the state.

There are 14 autonomous districts. Except for the two autonomous districts around the cities of Yamoussoukro and Abidjan, the remaining 12 autonomous districts are further subdivided into 31 regions, which are further subdivided into 108 third-level subdivisions, the departments (French: départements). Departments are subdivided into 510 sub-prefectures (French: sous-préfectures). The lowest level of administrative organisation, which exist in limited numbers, is the commune. Although they are not divided into regions, the autonomous districts of Abidjan and Yamoussoukro do contain departments, sub-prefectures, and communes.

== Governance and purpose ==
Each district is headed by a governor, who is appointed by the council of ministers (cabinet) of the national government.

Districts have been given four primary responsibilities:

1. to administer major development projects in the district;
2. to balance the application of state investments and programmes throughout the district in order to minimise regional disparities;
3. to promote the economic and cultural potentials of large groups; and
4. to combat regionalism.

== List of districts ==
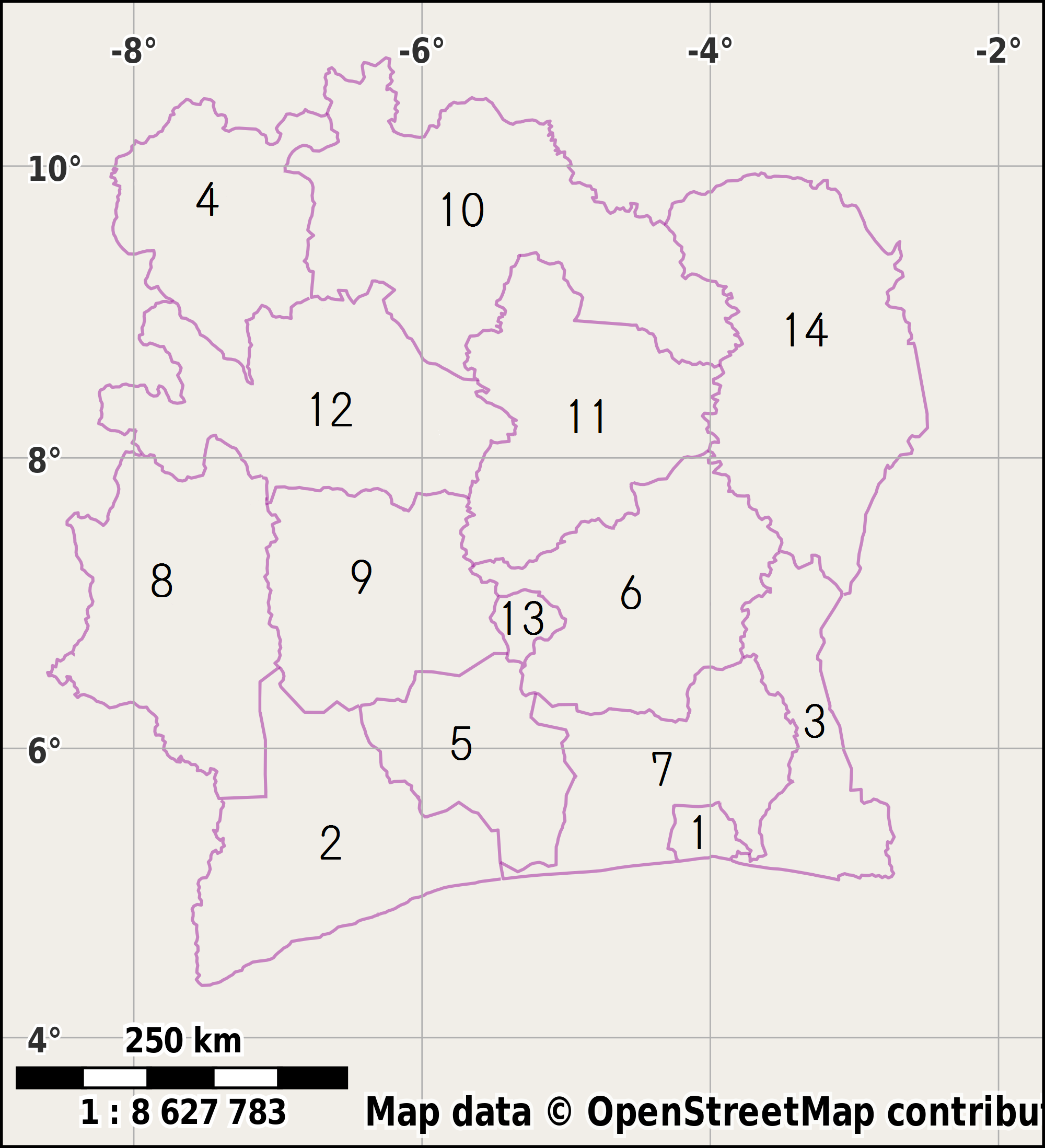
Districts of Ivory Coast

The following is the list of districts, district capitals and each district's regions

Map no.	District	District capital	Regions	Region seat	Population (District)	Population Regions	Area KM² Districts (M²)
1	Abidjan (District Autonome d'Abidjan)				4,707,404		2,119 (818)
2	Bas-Sassandra (District du Bas-Sassandra)	San-Pédro	Gbôklé	Sassandra	2,280,548	400,798	25,800 (10,000)
2	Bas-Sassandra (District du Bas-Sassandra)	San-Pédro	Nawa	Soubré	2,280,548	1,053,084	25,800 (10,000)
2	Bas-Sassandra (District du Bas-Sassandra)	San-Pédro	San-Pédro	San-Pédro	2,280,548	826,666	25,800 (10,000)
3	Comoé (District du Comoé)	Abengourou	Indénié-Djuablin	Abengourou	1,203,052	560,432	14,173 (5,472)
3	Comoé (District du Comoé)	Abengourou	Sud-Comoé	Aboisso	1,203,052	642,620	14,173 (5,472)
4	Denguélé (District du Denguélé)	Odienné	Folon	Minignan	289,779	96,415	20,997 (8,107)
4	Denguélé (District du Denguélé)	Odienné	Kabadougou	Odienné	289,779	193,364	20,997 (8,107)
5	Gôh-Djiboua (District du Gôh-Djiboua)	Gagnoa	Gôh	Gagnoa	1,605,286	876,117	17,580 (6,790)
5	Gôh-Djiboua (District du Gôh-Djiboua)	Gagnoa	Lôh-Djiboua	Divo	1,605,286	729,169	17,580 (6,790)
6	Lacs (District des Lacs)	Dimbokro	Bélier	Yamoussoukro	1,258,604	346,768	28,500 (11,000)
6	Lacs (District des Lacs)	Dimbokro	Iffou	Daoukro	1,258,604	311,642	28,500 (11,000)
6	Lacs (District des Lacs)	Dimbokro	Moronou	Bongouanou	1,258,604	352,616	28,500 (11,000)
6	Lacs (District des Lacs)	Dimbokro	N'Zi	Dimbokro	1,258,604	247,578	28,500 (11,000)
7	Lagunes (District des Lagunes)	Dabou	Agnéby-Tiassa	Agboville	1,478,047	606,852	23,280 (8,990)
7	Lagunes (District des Lagunes)	Dabou	Grands-Ponts	Dabou	1,478,047	356,495	23,280 (8,990)
7	Lagunes (District des Lagunes)	Dabou	La Mé	Adzopé	1,478,047	514,700	23,280 (8,990)
8	Montagnes (District des Montagnes)	Man	Cavally	Guiglo	2,371,920	459,964	31,050 (11,990)
8	Montagnes (District des Montagnes)	Man	Guémon	Duékoué	2,371,920	919,392	31,050 (11,990)
8	Montagnes (District des Montagnes)	Man	Tonkpi	Man	2,371,920	992,564	31,050 (11,990)
9	Sassandra-Marahoué (District du Sassandra-Marahoué)	Daloa	Haut-Sassandra	Daloa	2,293,304	1,430,960	23,940 (9,240)
9	Sassandra-Marahoué (District du Sassandra-Marahoué)	Daloa	Marahoué	Bouaflé	2,293,304	862,344	23,940 (9,240)
10	Savanes (District des Savanes)	Korhogo	Bagoué	Boundiali	1,607,497	375,687	40,210 (15,530)
10	Savanes (District des Savanes)	Korhogo	Poro	Korhogo	1,607,497	763,852	40,210 (15,530)
10	Savanes (District des Savanes)	Korhogo	Tchologo	Ferkessédougou	1,607,497	467,958	40,210 (15,530)
11	Vallée du Bandama (District de la Vallée du Bandama)	Bouaké	Gbêkê	Bouaké	1,440,826	1,010,849	28,518 (11,011)
11	Vallée du Bandama (District de la Vallée du Bandama)	Bouaké	Hambol	Katiola	1,440,826	429,977	28,518 (11,011)
12	Woroba (District du Woroba)	Séguéla	Béré	Mankono	845,139	389,758	31,088 (12,003)
12	Woroba (District du Woroba)	Séguéla	Bafing	Touba	845,139	183,047	31,088 (12,003)
12	Woroba (District du Woroba)	Séguéla	Worodougou	Séguéla	845,139	272,334	31,088 (12,003)
13	Yamoussoukro (District Autonome du Yamoussoukro)				355,573		3,500 (1,350)
14	Zanzan (District du Zanzan)	Bondoukou	Bounkani	Bouna	934,352	267,167	38,251 (14,769)
14	Zanzan (District du Zanzan)	Bondoukou	Gontougo	Bondoukou	934,352	667,185	38,251 (14,769)

== 2011 administrative subdivision changes ==
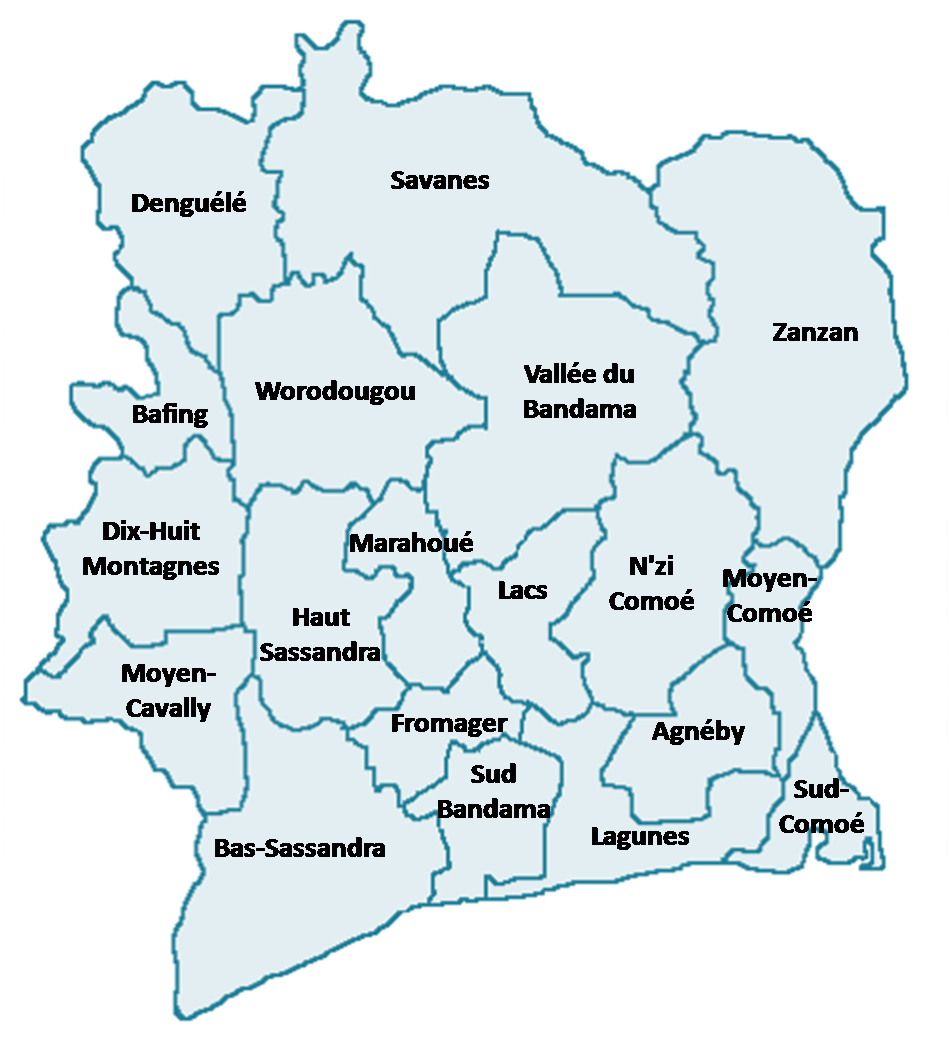
Regions of Ivory Coast prior to 2011

Prior to September 2011, Ivory Coast's first-level administrative subdivisions were 19 regions. In 2011, the regions were reorganized into the 14 districts (12 regular districts and 2 autonomous districts). In 2014, the districts were abolished except for the two autonomous districts of Abidjan and Yamoussoukro. Then in 2021 the former districts were reinstated as autonomous districts. The following is a summary of how the districts were constructed from the former regions:

- The largest city, Abidjan, and the political capital, Yamoussoukro, and their surrounding areas were split to form autonomous districts. Abidjan was formerly part of Lagunes Region and Yamoussoukro was formerly part of Lacs Region.
- Of the 19 regions, the northern regions of Denguélé, Savanes, Vallée du Bandama, and Zanzan were re-designated as districts with no change in territory.
- The old Agnéby region and what remained of Lagunes Region were merged to form the new Lagunes District.
- The old Bafing and Worodougou Regions were merged to form the new Woroba District.
- The Department of Fresco was transferred from the former Sud-Bandama Region to the Bas-Sassandra Region to form the new Bas-Sassandra District, while the remainder of Sud-Bandama Region merged with Fromager Region to form the new Gôh-Djiboua District.
- The old Dix-Huit Montagnes and Moyen-Cavally Regions merged to form the new Montagnes District.
- The old Haut-Sassandra and Marahoué Regions merged to form the new Sassandra-Marahoué District.
- The old N'Zi-Comoé Region and what remained of Lacs Region were merged to form the new Lacs District.
- The old Moyen-Comoé and Sud-Comoé Regions were merged to form the new Comoé District.

== See also ==
- ISO 3166-2:CI Districts of the Ivory Coast
