= ZSS =

ZSS may refer to:

- Zero speed switch
- Zhenghua Secondary School, a secondary school in Bukit Panjang, Singapore
- ZSS-FM, a radio station in Nassau, Bahamas
- ZSS, the IATA airport code for Sassandra Airport, Côte d'Ivoire
