= Gnégrouboué =

Gnégrouboué Gaouroubré
- Village
- Location in Ivory Coast
- Coordinates: 5°27′N 6°15′W
- Country: Ivory Coast
- District: Bas-Sassandra
- Region: Gbôklé
- Department: Sassandra
- Sub-prefecture: Médon
- Time zone: UTC+0 (GMT)

Gnégrouboué (also spelled Gaouroubré) is a village in south-western Ivory Coast. It is in the sub-prefecture of Médon, Sassandra Department, Gbôklé Region, Bas-Sassandra District.

Gnégrouboué was a commune until March 2012, when it became one of 1,126 communes nationwide that were abolished.
