= Kokolopozo =

- Village
- Location in Ivory Coast
- Coordinates: 5°8′N 6°5′W
- Country: Ivory Coast
- District: Bas-Sassandra
- Region: Gbôklé
- Department: Sassandra
- Sub-prefecture: Dakpadou
- Time zone: UTC+0 (GMT)

Kokolopozo is a village in southern Ivory Coast. It is in the sub-prefecture of Dakpadou, Sassandra Department, Gbôklé Region, Bas-Sassandra District.

Kokolopozo was a commune until March 2012, when it became one of 1,126 communes nationwide that were abolished.
