= Arokpa =

Arokpa Ahorokpa
- Village
- Location in Ivory Coast
- Coordinates: 4°59′N 6°0′W
- Country: Ivory Coast
- District: Bas-Sassandra
- Region: Gbôklé
- Department: Sassandra
- Sub-prefecture: Sassandra
- Time zone: UTC+0 (GMT)

Arokpa (also spelled Ahorokpa) is a coastal village in south-western Ivory Coast. It is in the sub-prefecture of Sassandra, Sassandra Department, Gbôklé Region, Bas-Sassandra District.

Arokpa was a commune until March 2012, when it became one of 1,126 communes nationwide that were abolished.
