= Gnago =

- Village
- Location in Ivory Coast
- Coordinates: 5°11′N 5°47′W
- Country: Ivory Coast
- District: Bas-Sassandra
- Region: Gbôklé
- Department: Sassandra
- Sub-prefecture: Sago
- Time zone: UTC+0 (GMT)

Gnago is the name of two villages in south-western Ivory Coast. They are in the sub-prefecture of Sago, Sassandra Department, Gbôklé Region, Bas-Sassandra District. The villages are designated Gnago 1 and Gnago 2.

Gnago was a commune until March 2012, when it became one of 1,126 communes nationwide that were abolished.
