= Gaoulou =

Commune in Côte d'Ivoire

- Village
- Location within Ivory Coast
- Coordinates: 05°01′55″N 06°09′02″W
- Country: Cote d'Ivoire
- District: Bas-Sassandra
- Region: Gbôklé
- Department: Sassandra
- Elevation: 13 m (43 ft)

Population (2014)
  - Total: 12,184
- Time zone: UTC+0 (GMT)

Gaoulou is a village of Sassandra Department, Gbôklé Region, Bas-Sassandra District, Côte d'Ivoire. As of the year 2014, it has a total population of 12,184.

== Geography ==
Gaoulou is situated on the southern portion of Sassandra Department. It is on the west bank of Sassandra River, approximately 11 kilometres northwest of Sassandra, the capital of Sassandra Department. It has an average elevation of 13 metres above the sea level.

== Climate ==
Gaoulou has a tropical rainforest climate. On average, it sees the most rainfall in June with 304 mm, and the least in January with 88 mm.

Climate data for Gaoulou
Month	Jan	Feb	Mar	Apr	May	Jun	Jul	Aug	Sep	Oct	Nov	Dec	Year
Mean daily maximum °C (°F)	30.5 (86.9)	31 (88)	31.3 (88.3)	31 (88)	29.4 (84.9)	27.6 (81.7)	27 (81)	26.9 (80.4)	27.8 (82.0)	28.6 (83.5)	29.2 (84.6)	29.6 (85.3)	29.2 (84.6)
Daily mean °C (°F)	26.2 (79.2)	26.7 (80.1)	27 (81)	26.9 (80.4)	25.9 (78.6)	24.7 (76.5)	24.4 (75.9)	23.2 (73.8)	24.5 (76.1)	25 (77)	25.4 (77.7)	25.8 (78.4)	25.5 (77.9)
Mean daily minimum °C (°F)	23.3 (73.9)	24 (75)	24.1 (75.4)	24.1 (75.4)	22.5 (72.5)	22.8 (73.0)	22.4 (72.3)	22.4 (72.3)	22.6 (72.7)	22.8 (73.0)	22.9 (73.2)	23.2 (73.8)	23.1 (73.5)
Average rainfall mm (inches)	88 (3.5)	101 (4.0)	138 (5.4)	143 (5.6)	254 (10.0)	304 (12.0)	145 (5.7)	114 (4.5)	194 (7.6)	209 (8.2)	169 (6.7)	118 (4.6)	1,977 (77.8)
Source: Climate-Data.org
