= Switch =

Electrical component that can break an electrical circuit

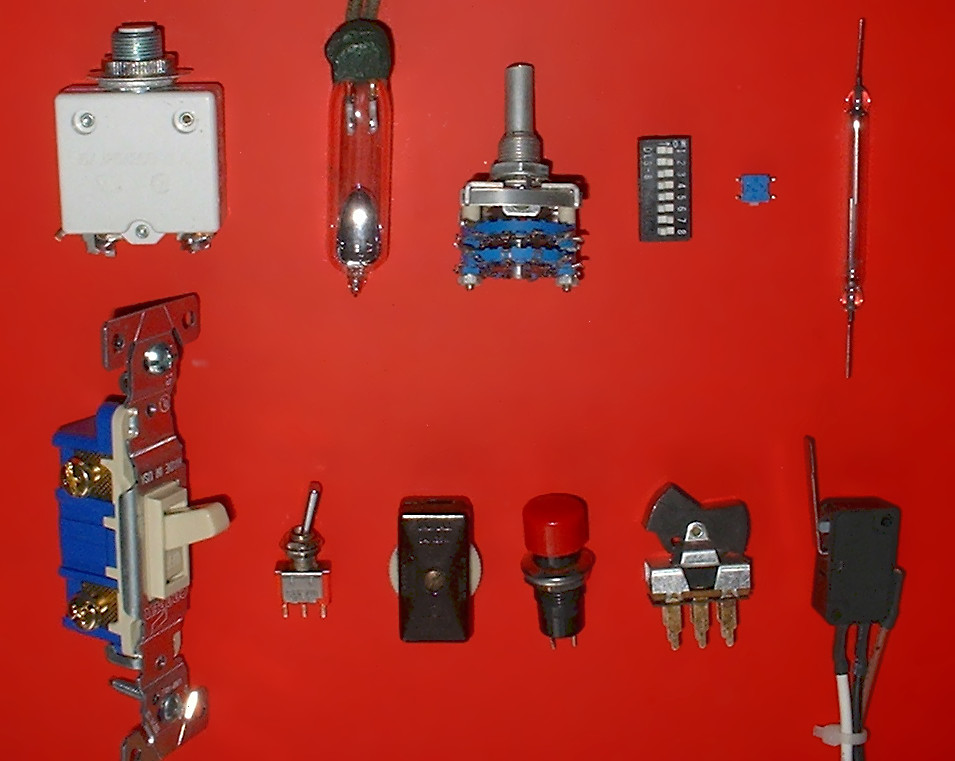
Electrical switches. Top, left to right: circuit breaker, mercury switch, wafer switch, DIP switch, surface mount switch, reed switch. Bottom, left to right: wall switch (U.S. style), miniature toggle switch, in‑line switch, push-button switch, rocker switch, microswitch.

In electrical engineering, a switch is an electrical component that can disconnect or connect the conducting path in an electrical circuit, interrupting the electric current or diverting it from one conductor to another. The most common type of switch is an electromechanical device consisting of one or more sets of movable electrical contacts connected to external circuits. When a pair of contacts is touching, current can pass between them, while the contacts are separated no current can flow.

Switches are made in many different configurations; they may have multiple sets of contacts controlled by the same knob or actuator, and the contacts may operate simultaneously, sequentially, or alternately. A switch may be operated manually, for example, a light switch or a keyboard button, or may function as a sensing element to sense the position of a machine part, liquid level, pressure, or temperature, such as a thermostat. Many specialized forms exist, such as the toggle switch, rotary switch, mercury switch, push-button switch, reversing switch, relay, and circuit breaker. A common use is control of lighting, where multiple switches may be wired into one circuit to allow convenient control of light fixtures. Switches in high-powered circuits must have special construction to prevent destructive arcing when they are opened.

== Description ==
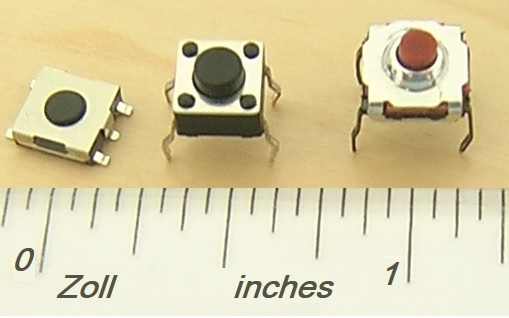
Three tactile push-button switches

The most familiar form of switch is a manually operated electromechanical device with one or more sets of electrical contacts, which are connected to external circuits. Each set of contacts can be in one of two states: either "closed" meaning the contacts are touching and electricity can flow between them, or "open", meaning the contacts are separated and the switch is nonconducting. The mechanism actuating the transition between these two states (open or closed) is usually (there are other types of actions) either an "alternate action" (flip the switch for continuous "on" or "off") or "momentary" (push for "on" and release for "off") type.

A switch may be directly manipulated by a human as a control signal to a system, such as a computer keyboard button, or to control power flow in a circuit, such as a light switch. Automatically operated switches can be used to control the motions of machines, for example, to indicate that a garage door has reached its full open position or that a machine tool is in a position to accept another workpiece. Switches may be operated by process variables such as pressure, temperature, flow, current, voltage, and force, acting as sensors in a process and used to automatically control a system. For example, a thermostat is a temperature-operated switch used to control a heating process. A switch that is operated by another electrical circuit is called a relay. Large switches may be remotely operated by a motor drive mechanism. Some switches are used to isolate electric power from a system, providing a visible point of isolation that can be padlocked if necessary to prevent accidental operation of a machine during maintenance, or to prevent electric shock.

An ideal switch would have no voltage drop when closed, and would have no limits on voltage or current rating. It would have zero rise time and fall time during state changes, and would change state without "bouncing" between on and off positions.

Practical switches fall short of this ideal; as the result of roughness and oxide films, they exhibit contact resistance, limits on the current and voltage they can handle, finite switching time, etc. The ideal switch is often used in circuit analysis as it greatly simplifies the system of equations to be solved, but this can lead to a less accurate solution. Theoretical treatment of the effects of non-ideal properties is required in the design of large networks of switches, as for example used in telephone exchanges.

== Contacts ==
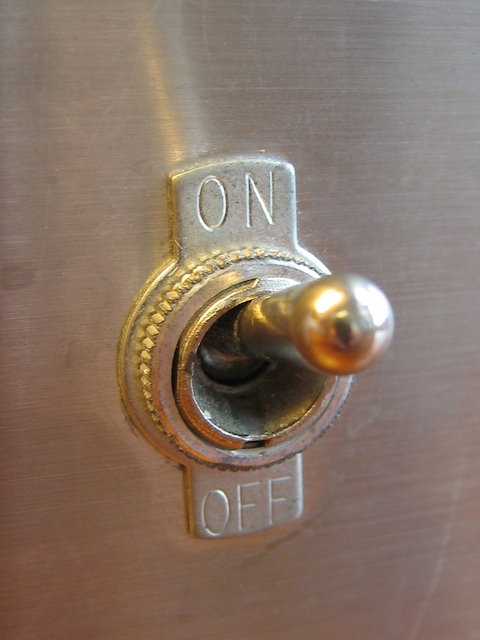
A toggle switch in the "on" position

In the simplest case, a switch has two conductive pieces, often metal, called contacts, connected to an external circuit, that touch to complete (make) the circuit, and separate to open (break) the circuit. The contact material is chosen for its resistance to corrosion, because most metals form insulating oxides that would prevent the switch from working. Contact materials are also chosen on the basis of electrical conductivity, hardness (resistance to abrasive wear), mechanical strength, low cost and low toxicity. The formation of oxide layers at contact surface, as well as surface roughness and contact pressure, determine the contact resistance, and wetting current of a mechanical switch. Sometimes the contacts are plated with noble metals, for their excellent conductivity and resistance to corrosion. They may be designed to wipe against each other to clean off any contamination. Nonmetallic conductors, such as conductive plastic, are sometimes used. To prevent the formation of insulating oxides, a minimum wetting current may be specified for a given switch design.

=== Contact terminology ===
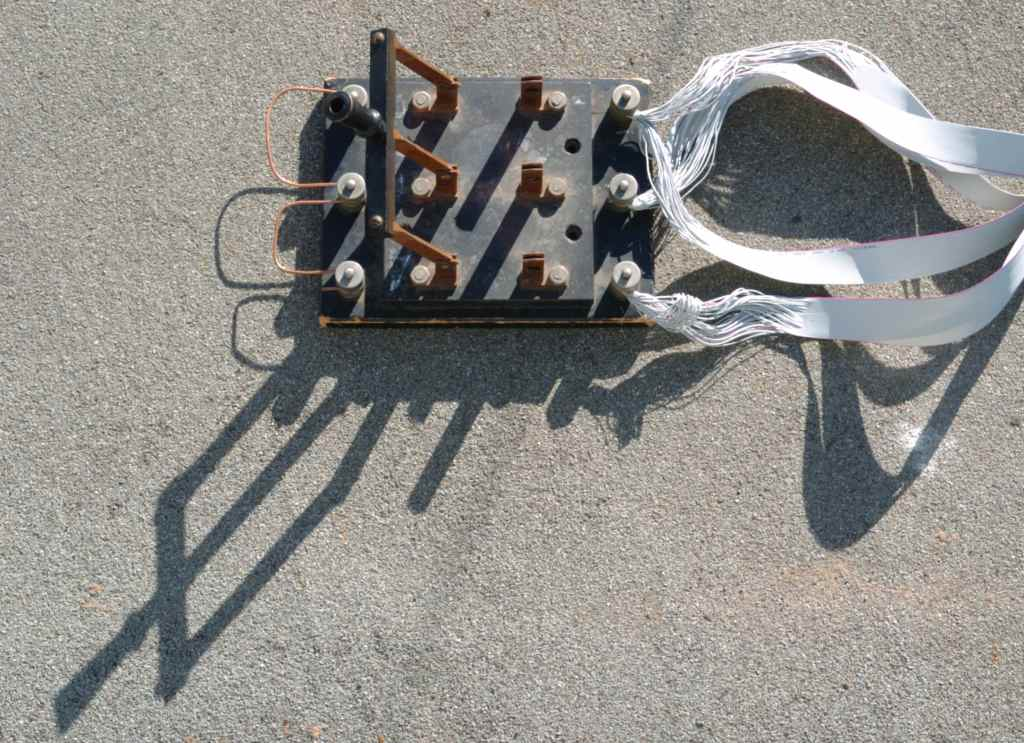
Triple-pole single-throw (TPST or 3PST) knife switch used to short the windings of a three‑phase wind turbine for braking purposes. Here the switch is shown in the open position.

In electronics, switches are classified according to the arrangement of their contacts. A pair of contacts is said to be "closed" when current can flow from one to the other. When the contacts are separated by an insulating air gap, they are said to be "open", and no current can flow between them at normal voltages. The terms "make" for closure of contacts and "break" for opening of contacts are also widely used.

The terms pole and throw are also used to describe switch contact variations. The number of "poles" is the number of electrically separate switches which are controlled by a single physical actuator. For example, a "2-pole" switch has two separate, parallel sets of contacts that open and close in unison via the same mechanism. The number of "throws" is the number of separate wiring path choices other than "open" that the switch can adopt for each pole. A single-throw switch has one pair of contacts that can either be closed or open. A double-throw switch has a contact that can be connected to either of two other contacts, a triple-throw has a contact which can be connected to one of three other contacts, etc.

In a switch where the contacts remain in one state unless actuated, such as a push-button switch, the contacts can either be normally open (abbreviated "n.o." or "no" or NO) until closed by operation of the switch, or normally closed ("n.c." or "nc" or NC) (Note: The abbreviation N.C. (for "Normally closed") is also used to mean "Not connected" in the context of connector or part pins.) and opened by the switch action. A switch with both types of contact is called a changeover switch or double-throw switch. These may be "make-before-break" ("MBB" or shorting) which momentarily connects both circuits, or may be "break-before-make" ("BBM" or non-shorting) which interrupts one circuit before closing the other.

These terms have given rise to abbreviations for the types of switch which are used in the electronics industry such as "single-pole, single-throw" (SPST) (the simplest type, "on or off") or "single-pole, double-throw" (SPDT), connecting either of two terminals to the common terminal. In electrical power wiring (i.e., house and building wiring by electricians), names generally involve the suffix "-way"; however, these terms differ between British English and American English (i.e., the terms two way and three way are used with different meanings).

Electronics specification and abbreviation	Expansion of abbreviation	British mains wiring name	American electrical wiring name	Description	Schematic	Symbol IEC 60617
SPST (1P1T)	Single pole, single throw	One-way	Two-way	A simple on-off switch: The two terminals are either connected together or disconnected from each other. An example is a light switch.		
SPST-NO Form A	Single pole, single throw, normally open			A simple on-off switch. The two terminals are normally disconnected (open) and are closed when the switch is activated. An example is a pushbutton switch.		
SPST-NC; Form B	Single pole, single throw, normally closed			A simple on-off switch. The two terminals are normally connected together (closed) and are open when the switch is activated. An example is a pushbutton switch.		
SPDT; Form C	Single pole, double throw	Two-way	Three-way	A simple break-before-make changeover switch: C (COM, Common) is connected either to L1 or to L2.		
SPCO; SPTT, c.o.	Single pole changeover or single pole, centre off or single pole, triple throw			Similar to SPDT. Some suppliers use SPCO/SPTT for switches with a stable off position in the centre and SPDT for those without.		
				Serial switch or two-circuit switch		
DPST (2P1T)	Double pole, single throw	Double pole	Double pole	Equivalent to two SPST switches controlled by a single mechanism.		
DPDT (2P2T)	Double pole, double throw			Equivalent to two SPDT switches controlled by a single mechanism.		
DPCO	Double pole changeover or double pole, centre off			Schematically equivalent to DPDT. Some suppliers use DPCO for switches with a stable center position and DPDT for those without. A DPDT/DPCO switch with a center position can be "off" in the center, not connected to either L1 or L2, or "on", connected to both L1 and L2 at the same time. The positions of such switches are commonly referenced as "on-off-on" and "on-on-on" respectively.		
	4-way crossover switch	Intermediate switch	Four-way switch	DPDT switch internally wired for polarity-reversal applications: only four rather than six wires are brought outside the switch housing. Also called cross switch, crossover switch or reversing switch.		
2P6T	Two pole, six throw			Changeover switch with a COM (Common), which can connect to L1, L2, L3, L4, L5, or L6; with a second switch (2P, two pole) controlled by a single mechanism.		

Switches with larger numbers of poles or throws can be described by replacing the "S" or "D" with a number (e.g. 3PST, SP4T, etc.) or in some cases the letter "T" (for "triple") or "Q" (for "quadruple"). In the rest of this article the terms SPST, SPDT and intermediate will be used to avoid the ambiguity.

=== Contact bounce ===
==== Bounce ====
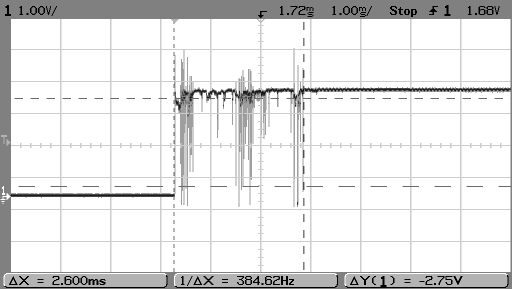
Oscilloscope snapshot showing voltage fluctuations caused by a switch bouncing between on and off (even swinging above V_{high} and below V_{low}) many times over 2.6 ms before settling

Contact bounce (also called chatter) is a common problem with mechanical switches, relays and battery contacts, which arises as the result of electrical contact resistance (ECR) phenomena at interfaces. Switch and relay contacts are usually made of springy metals. When the contacts strike together, their momentum and elasticity act together to cause them to bounce apart one or more times before making steady contact. The result is a rapidly pulsed electric current instead of a clean transition from zero to full current. The effect is usually negligible in low-current signal circuits, but becomes critical in power circuits where high inrush currents during bounce intervals cause localized heating, arc erosion, and contact welding. It also causes problems in some analogue and logic circuits that respond fast enough to misinterpret the on‑off pulses as a data stream. In the design of micro-contacts, controlling surface structure (surface roughness) and minimizing the formation of passivated layers on metallic surfaces are instrumental in inhibiting chatter.

In high-current power circuits, contact bounce has more severe consequences than signal errors. When contacts close under high voltage, bouncing creates repeated arc discharges between the separating surfaces. During each bounce interval, the contact resistance rises sharply while inrush current may reach several thousand amperes. The resulting instantaneous power dissipation (P = I²R) concentrated at the contact point can reach hundreds of kilowatts within milliseconds, causing localized melting and contact welding. This mechanism is particularly critical in battery energy storage systems (BESS) and electric vehicle contactors operating at 400 V and above, where pre-charge circuits are used to limit inrush current as a workaround for inadequate contact physics.

In the Hammond organ, multiple wires are pressed together under the piano keys of the manuals. Their bouncing and non-synchronous closing of the switches is known as Hammond Click and compositions exist that use and emphasize this feature. Some electronic organs have a switchable replica of this sound effect.

==== Debouncing ====
SPST switch bounce filter using a Schmitt trigger and capacitor

The effects of contact bounce can be eliminated by:

- Use of mercury-wetted contacts, but these are now infrequently used because of the hazards of mercury. Galinstan-based liquid-metal composite contacts (CLMC) have been proposed as a non-toxic alternative that eliminates bounce mechanically.
- Alternatively, contact circuit voltages can be low-pass filtered to reduce or eliminate multiple pulses from appearing.
- In digital systems, multiple samples of the contact state can be taken at a low rate and examined for a steady sequence, so that contacts can settle before the contact level is considered reliable and acted upon. See Keyboard technology § Debouncing.
- Bounce in SPDT ("single-pole, double-throw") switch contacts signals can be filtered out using an SR flip-flop (latch) or Schmitt trigger.

All of these methods are referred to as 'debouncing'.

==== Failure analysis ====
Mechanical switch contacts fail through several cumulative mechanisms that interact during service life:

Arc erosion occurs when the electric arc formed at contact separation vaporizes and transfers contact material. Over thousands of operations, this leads to pitting, material loss, and increased contact resistance.

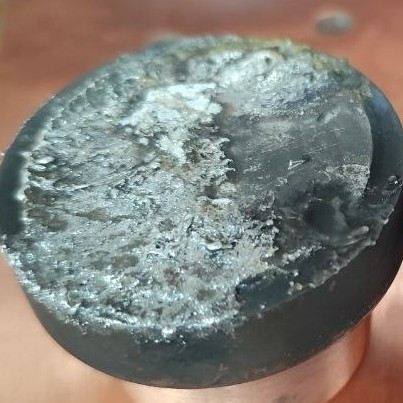
Silver alloy contacts rated for 6,000 A DC after failure due to arc erosion.

Contact welding results from contact bounce under high inrush current. During each bounce interval, the contact resistance rises sharply — from a typical closed-state value of 0.2 mΩ to values exceeding 30 mΩ — while inrush current may reach several thousand amperes. The resulting instantaneous power dissipation (P = I²R) concentrated at the contact point causes localized melting and permanent welding of contacts.

Electrodynamic repulsion under short-circuit currents causes contacts to be forced apart by electromagnetic forces proportional to the square of the current. In solid metal contacts, these forces limit the short-circuit withstand capability. Copper contacts have been observed to separate at 10 kA, leading to sustained arcing and welding upon re-closure.

Liquid-metal composite contacts (CLMC) based on galinstan address three of these failure mechanisms simultaneously through a coupled mechanical-electrical mechanism: the elastic refractory metal framework (molybdenum or tungsten wire mesh) retains galinstan by capillary forces, maintaining a liquid contact surface through both closing and opening cycles. This eliminates contact bounce and welding; the uniform current distribution across the liquid surface eliminates electrodynamic repulsion forces; and the self-restoring liquid surface prevents permanent arc erosion of solid contact asperities.

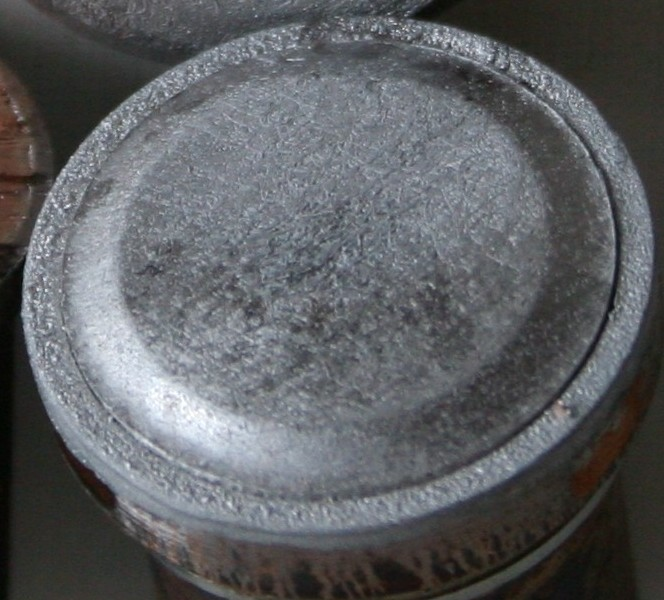
CLMC after 200,000 switching cycles at 600 A, 660 V AC (IEC 60947 AC-4 duty) — no arc erosion or welding visible.

=== Arcs and quenching ===
When the power being switched is sufficiently large, the electron flow across opening switch contacts is sufficient to ionize the air molecules across the tiny gap between the contacts as the switch is opened, forming a gas plasma, also known as an electric arc. The plasma is of low resistance and is able to sustain power flow, even with the separation distance between the switch contacts steadily increasing. The plasma is also very hot and is capable of eroding the metal surfaces of the switch contacts (the same true for vacuum switches). Electric current arcing causes significant degradation of the contacts and also significant electromagnetic interference (EMI), requiring the use of arc suppression methods.

Where the voltage is sufficiently high, an arc can also form as the switch is closed and the contacts approach. If the voltage potential is sufficient to exceed the breakdown voltage of the air separating the contacts, an arc forms which is sustained until the switch closes completely and the switch surfaces make contact.

In either case, the standard method for minimizing arc formation and preventing contact damage is to use a fast-moving switch mechanism, typically using a spring-operated tipping-point mechanism to assure quick motion of switch contacts, regardless of the speed at which the switch control is operated by the user. Movement of the switch control lever applies tension to a spring until a tipping point is reached, and the contacts suddenly snap open or closed as the spring tension is released.

As the power being switched increases, other methods are used to minimize or prevent arc formation. A plasma is hot and will rise due to convection air currents. The arc can be quenched with a series of non-conductive blades spanning the distance between switch contacts, and as the arc rises, its length increases as it forms ridges rising into the spaces between the blades, until the arc is too long to stay sustained and is extinguished. A puffer may be used to blow a sudden high velocity burst of gas across the switch contacts, which rapidly extends the length of the arc to extinguish it quickly.

Extremely large switches often have switch contacts surrounded by something other than air to more rapidly extinguish the arc. For example, the switch contacts may operate in a vacuum, immersed in mineral oil, or in sulfur hexafluoride.

In AC power service, the current periodically passes through zero; this effect makes it harder to sustain an arc on opening. Manufacturers may rate switches with lower voltage or current rating when used in DC circuits.

=== Power switching ===
When a switch is designed to switch significant power, the transitional state of the switch as well as the ability to withstand continuous operating currents must be considered. When a switch is in the on state, its resistance is near zero and very little power is dropped in the contacts; when a switch is in the off state, its resistance is extremely high and even less power is dropped in the contacts. However, when the switch is flicked, the resistance must pass through a state where a quarter of the load's rated power (or worse if the load is not purely resistive) is briefly dropped in the switch.

For this reason, power switches intended to interrupt a load current have spring mechanisms to make sure the transition between on and off is as short as possible regardless of the speed at which the user moves the rocker.

Power switches usually come in two types. A momentary on‑off switch (such as on a laser pointer) usually takes the form of a button and only closes the circuit when the button is depressed. A regular on‑off switch (such as on a flashlight) has a constant on-off feature. Dual-action switches incorporate both of these features.

=== Inductive loads ===
When a strongly inductive load such as an electric motor is switched off, the current cannot drop instantaneously to zero; a spark will jump across the opening contacts. Switches for inductive loads must be rated to handle these cases. The spark will cause electromagnetic interference if not suppressed; a snubber network of a resistor and capacitor in series will quell the spark.

=== Incandescent loads ===
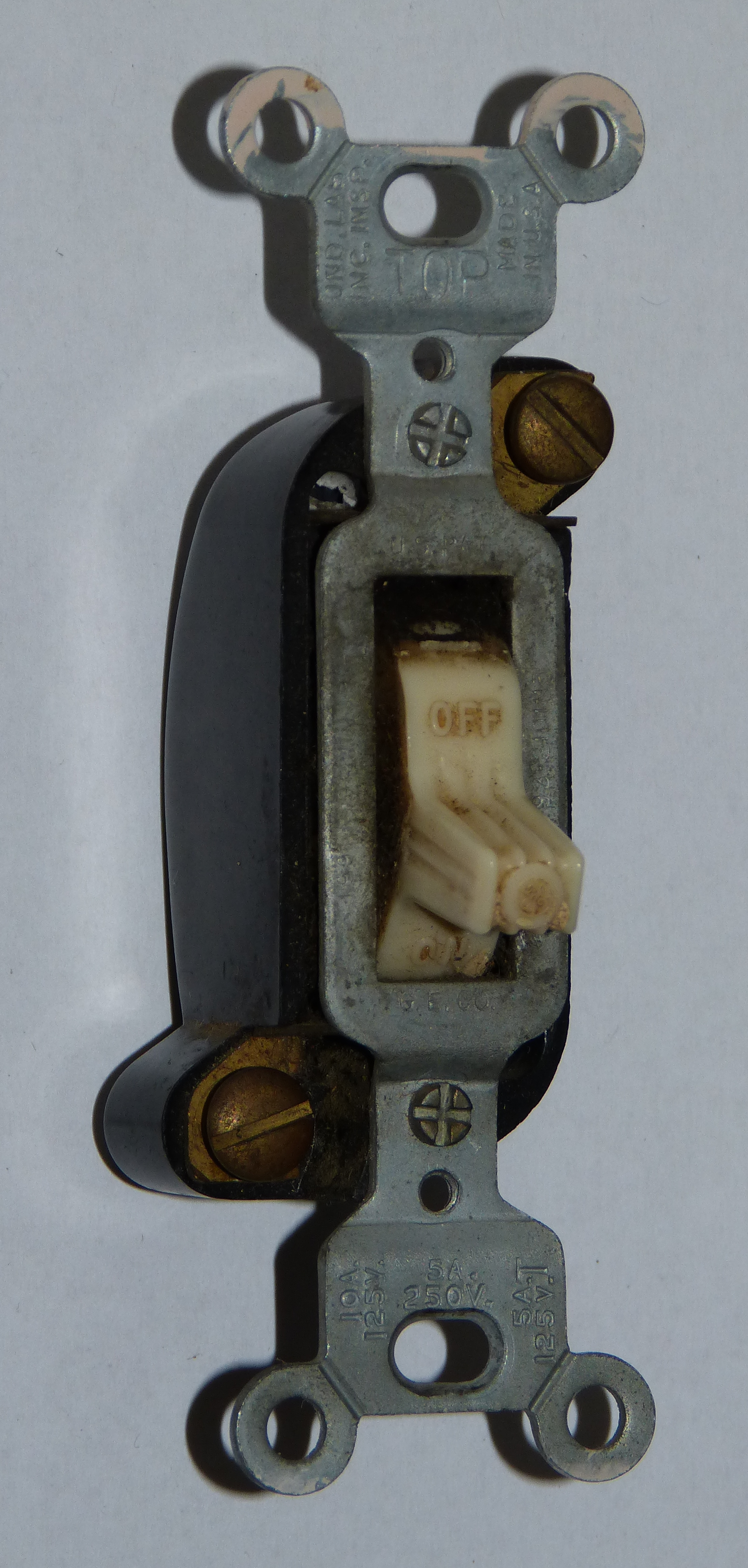
A "T-rated" wall switch (the T is for Tungsten filament) that is suited for incandescent loads

When turned on, an incandescent lamp draws a large inrush current of about ten times the steady-state current; as the filament heats up, its resistance rises and the current decreases to a steady-state value. A switch designed for an incandescent lamp load can withstand this inrush current.

=== Wetting current ===
Wetting current is the minimum current needing to flow through a mechanical switch while it is operated to break through any film of oxidation that may have been deposited on the switch contacts. The film of oxidation occurs often in areas with high humidity. Providing a sufficient amount of wetting current is a crucial step in designing systems that use delicate switches with small contact pressure as sensor inputs. Failing to do this might result in switches remaining electrically "open" due to contact oxidation.

== Actuator ==
The moving part that applies the operating force to the contacts is called the actuator, and may be a toggle or dolly, a rocker, a push-button or any type of mechanical linkage (see photo).

=== Biased switches ===
A switch normally maintains its set position once operated. A biased switch contains a mechanism that springs it into another position when released by an operator. The momentary push-button switch is a type of biased switch. The most common type is a "push-to-make" (or normally-open or NO) switch, which makes contact when the button is pressed and breaks when the button is released. Each key of a computer keyboard, for example, is a normally-open "push-to-make" switch. A "push-to-break" (or normally closed or NC) switch, on the other hand, breaks contact when the button is pressed and makes contact when it is released. An example of a push-to-break switch is a button used to release a door held closed by an electromagnet. The interior lamp of a household refrigerator is controlled by a switch that is held open when the door is closed.

=== Rotary switch ===
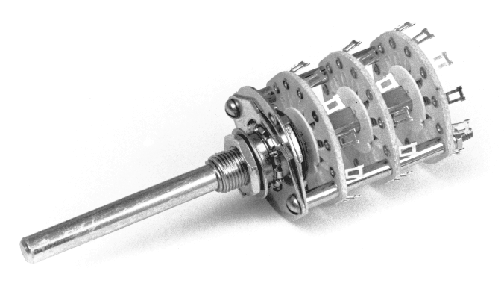
A three-deck stacked rotary switch. Any number of switching elements may be stacked in this manner, by using a longer shaft and additional spacing standoffs between each switching element.

A rotary switch operates with a twisting motion of the operating handle with at least two positions. One or more positions of the switch may be momentary (biased with a spring), requiring the operator to hold the switch in the position. Other positions may have a detent to hold the position when released. A rotary switch may have multiple levels or "decks" in order to allow it to control multiple circuits.

One form of rotary switch consists of a spindle or "rotor" that has a contact arm or "spoke" which projects from its surface like a cam. It has an array of terminals, arranged in a circle around the rotor, each of which serves as a contact for the "spoke" through which any one of a number of different electrical circuits can be connected to the rotor. The switch is layered to allow the use of multiple poles, each layer is equivalent to one pole. Usually such a switch has a detent mechanism so it "clicks" from one active position to another rather than stalls in an intermediate position. Thus a rotary switch provides greater pole and throw capabilities than simpler switches do.

Other types use a cam mechanism to operate multiple independent sets of contacts.

Rotary switches were used as channel selectors on television receivers until the early 1970s, as range selectors on electrical metering equipment, as band selectors on multi-band radios and other similar purposes. In industry, rotary switches are used for control of measuring instruments, switchgear, or in control circuits. For example, a radio controlled overhead crane may have a large multi-circuit rotary switch to transfer hard-wired control signals from the local manual controls in the cab to the outputs of the remote control receiver.

=== Toggle switch ===
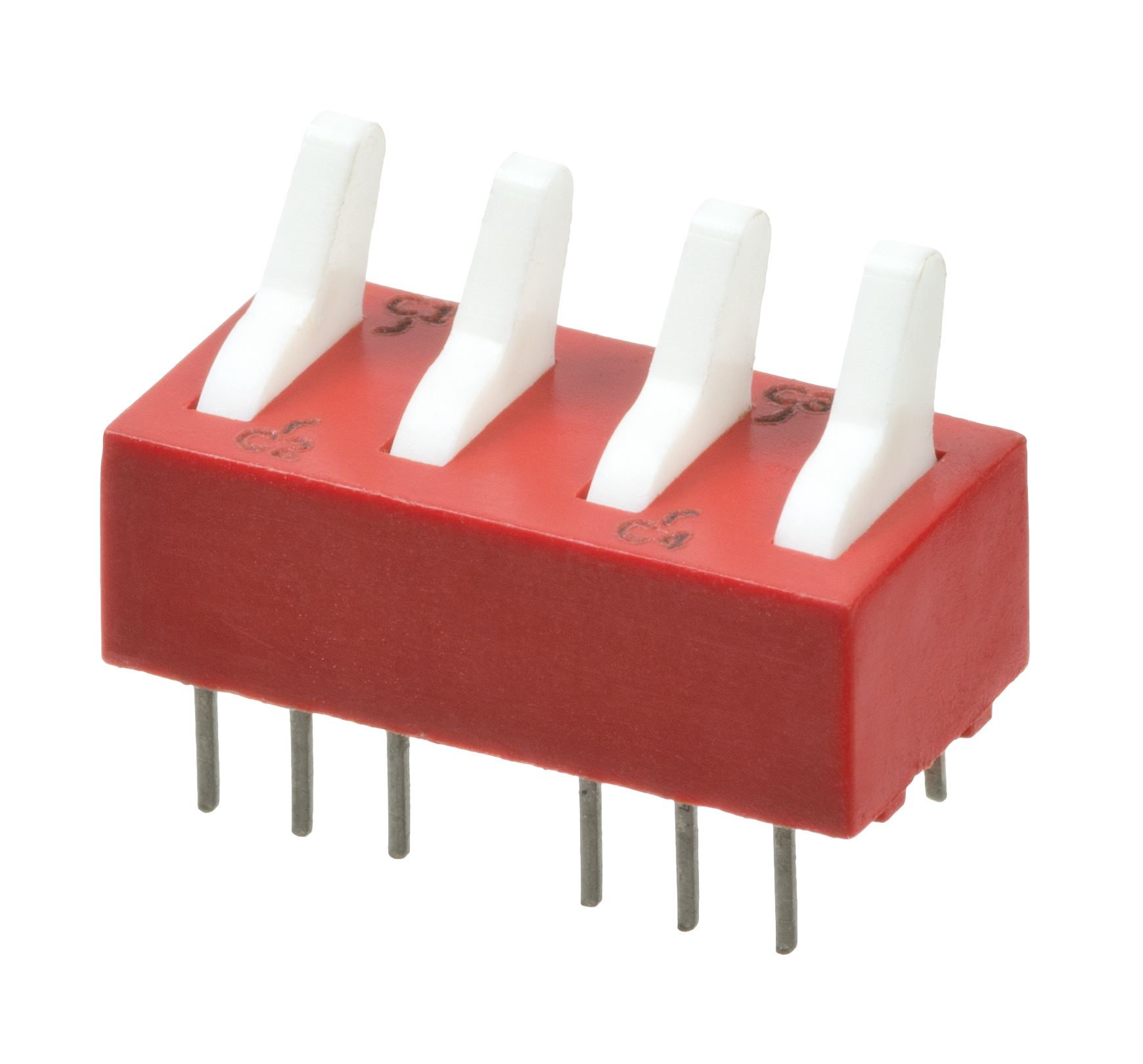
A toggle DIP switch with four inputs and outputs

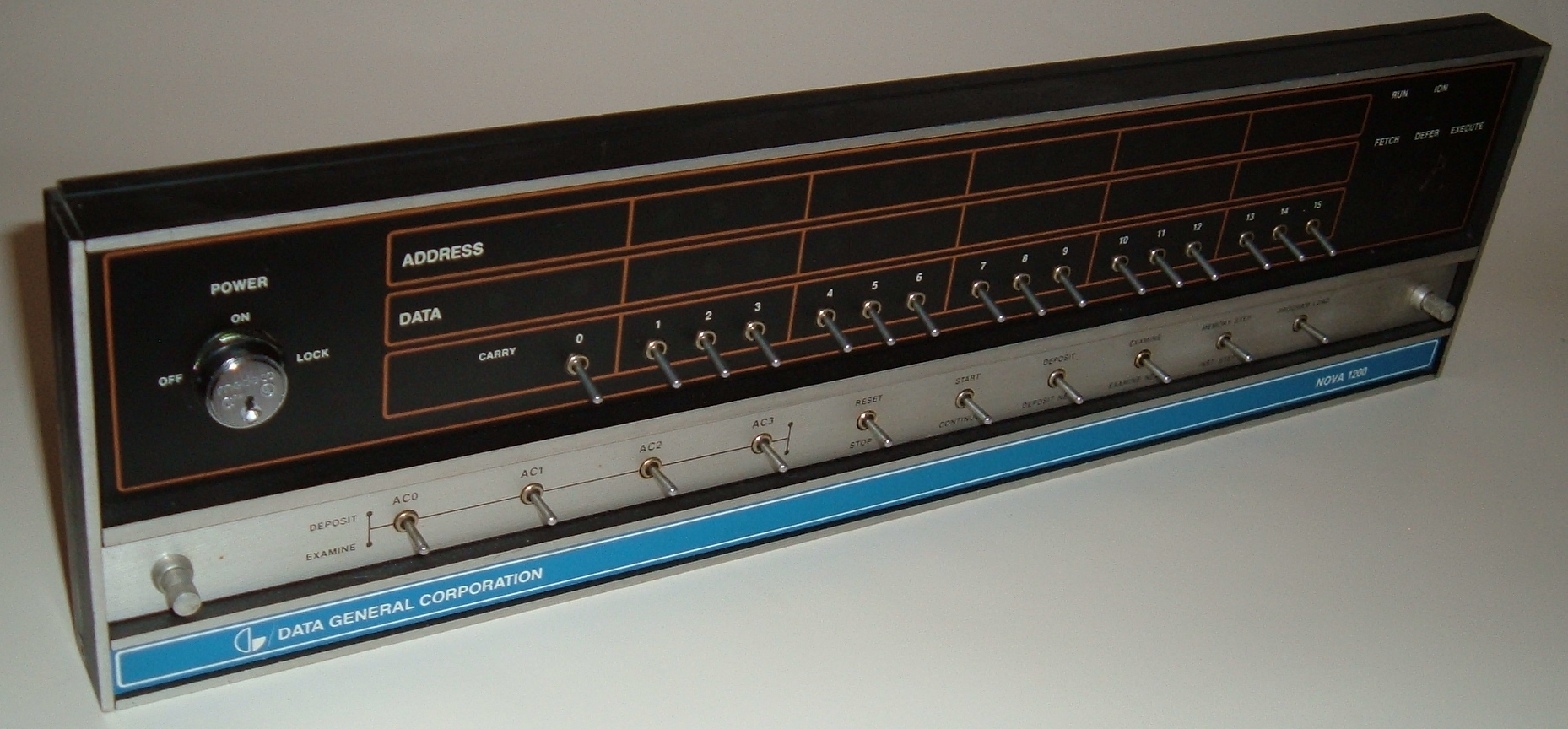
Bank of toggle switches on a Data General Nova minicomputer front panel

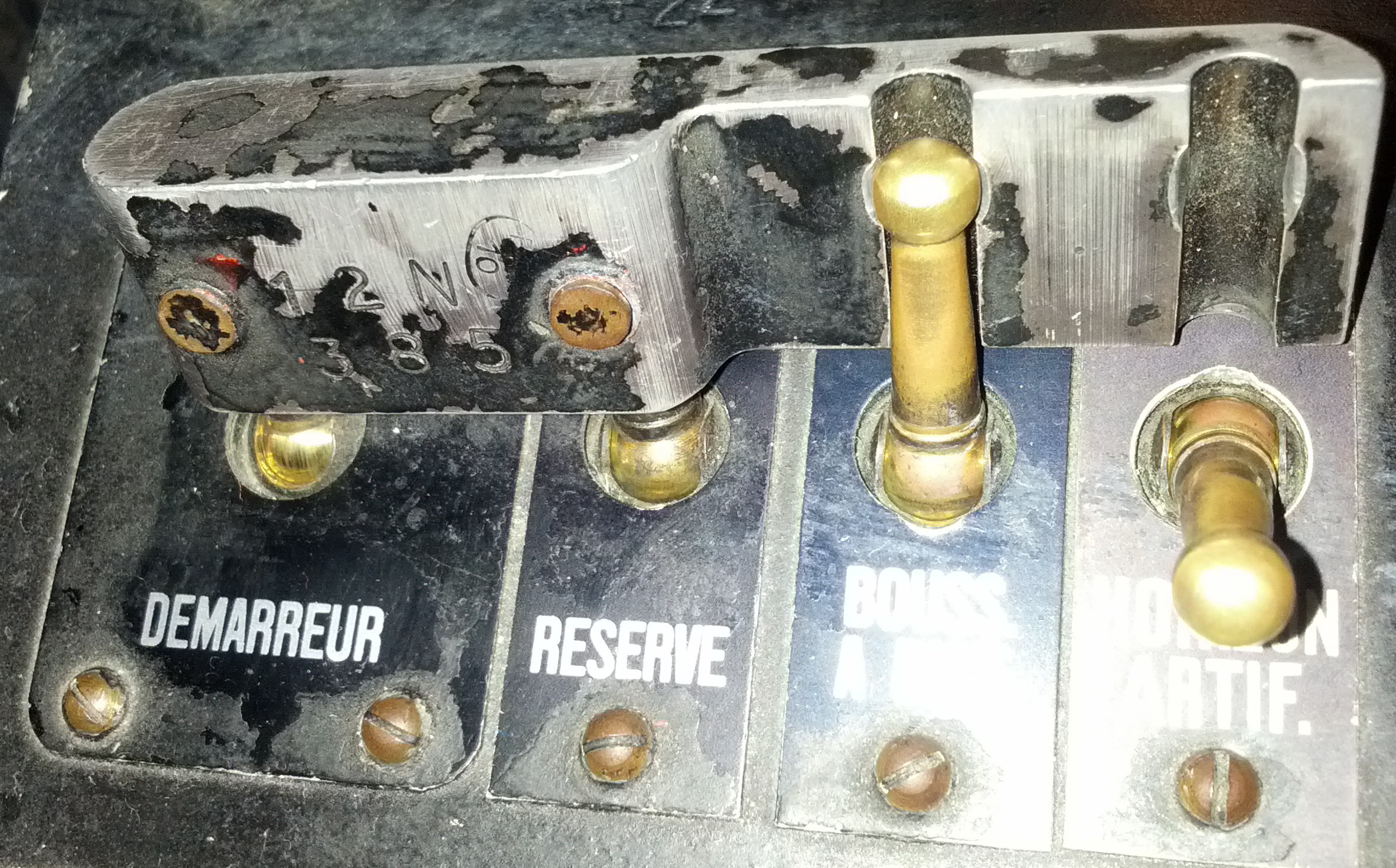
Toggle switches with the shared cover preventing certain forbidden combinations

A toggle switch or tumbler switch is a class of electrical switches that are manually actuated by a mechanical lever, handle, or rocking mechanism.

Toggle switches are available in many different styles and sizes, and are used in numerous applications. Many are designed to provide the simultaneous actuation of multiple sets of electrical contacts, or the control of large amounts of electric current or mains voltages.

The word "toggle" is a reference to a kind of mechanism or joint consisting of two arms, which are almost in line with each other, connected with an elbow-like pivot. However, the phrase "toggle switch" is applied to a switch with a short handle and a positive snap-action, whether it actually contains a toggle mechanism or not. Similarly, a switch where a definitive click is heard, is called a "positive on-off switch". A very common use of this type of switch is to switch lights or other electrical equipment on or off. Multiple toggle switches may be mechanically interlocked to prevent forbidden combinations.

In some contexts, particularly computing, a toggle switch, or the action of toggling, is understood in the different sense of a mechanical or software switch that alternates between two states each time it is activated, regardless of mechanical construction. For example, the caps lock key on a computer causes all letters to be generated in capitals after it is pressed once; pressing it again reverts to lower-case letters.

== Special types ==
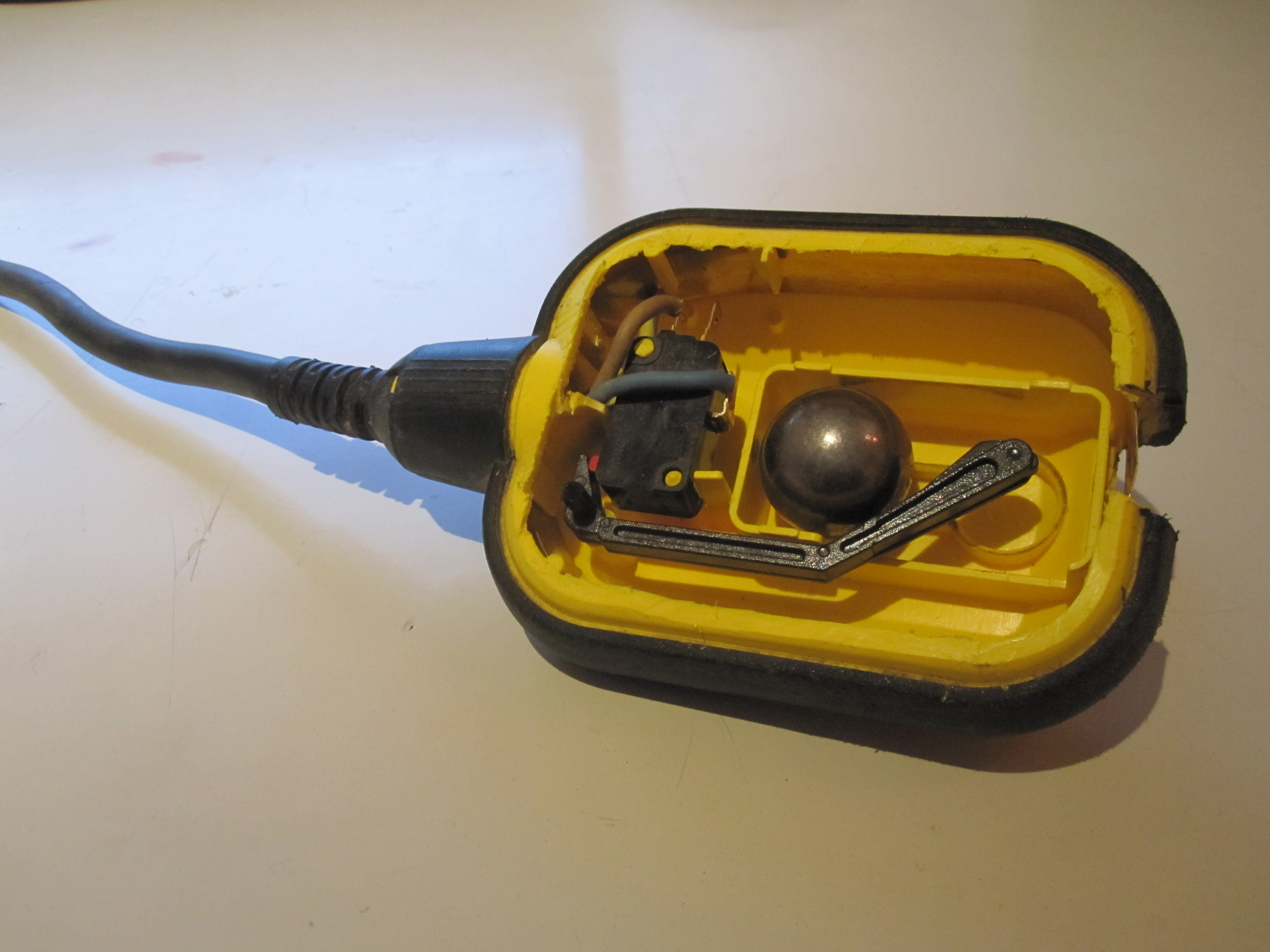
Opened float switch of a dirty-water pump

Switches can be designed to respond to any type of mechanical stimulus: for example, vibration (the trembler switch), tilt, air pressure, fluid level (a float switch), the turning of a key (key switch), linear or rotary movement (a limit switch or microswitch), or presence of a magnetic field (the reed switch). Many switches are operated automatically by changes in some environmental condition or by motion of machinery. A limit switch is used, for example, in machine tools to interlock operation with the proper position of tools. In heating or cooling systems a sail switch ensures that air flow is adequate in a duct. Pressure switches respond to fluid pressure.

=== Mercury tilt switch ===
The mercury switch consists of a drop of mercury inside a glass bulb with two or more contacts. The two contacts pass through the glass, and are connected by the mercury when the bulb is tilted to make the mercury roll on to them.

This type of switch performs much better than the ball tilt switch, as the liquid metal connection is unaffected by dirt, debris and oxidation, it wets the contacts ensuring a very low resistance bounce-free connection, and movement and vibration do not produce a poor contact. These types can be used for precision works.

It can also be used where arcing is dangerous (such as in the presence of explosive vapour) as the entire unit is sealed.

=== Knife switch ===
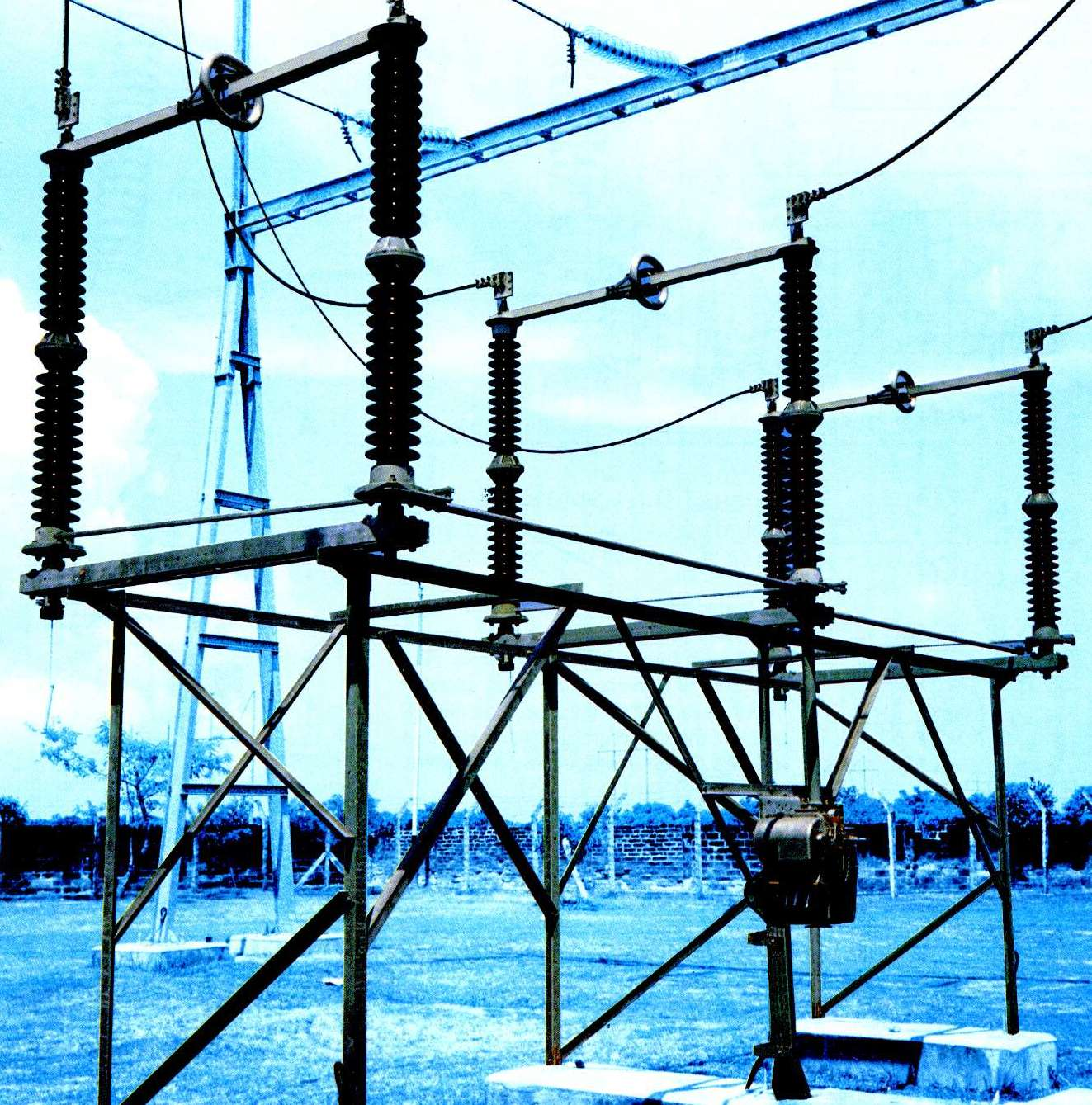
A high-voltage disconnect switch used in an electrical substation. Such switches are used mostly to isolate circuits, and usually cannot break load current. High-voltage switches are available for the highest transmission voltages, up to 1 million volts. This switch is gang-operated so that all three phases are interrupted at the same time.

Knife switches consist of a flat metal blade, hinged at one end, with an insulating handle for operation, and a fixed contact. When the switch is closed, current flows through the hinged pivot and blade and through the fixed contact. Such switches are usually not enclosed. The knife and contacts are typically formed of copper, steel, or brass, depending on the application. Fixed contacts may be backed up with a spring. Several parallel blades can be operated at the same time by one handle. The parts may be mounted on an insulating base with terminals for wiring, or may be directly bolted to an insulated switch board in a large assembly. Since the electrical contacts are exposed, the switch is used only where people cannot accidentally come in contact with the switch or where the voltage is so low as to not present a hazard.

Knife switches are made in many sizes from miniature switches to large devices used to carry thousands of amperes. In electrical transmission and distribution, gang-operated switches are used in circuits up to the highest voltages.

The disadvantages of the knife switch are the slow opening speed and the proximity of the operator to exposed live parts. Metal-enclosed safety disconnect switches are used for isolation of circuits in industrial power distribution. Sometimes spring-loaded auxiliary blades are fitted which momentarily carry the full current during opening, then quickly part to rapidly extinguish the arc.

=== Reversing switch ===
A DPDT switch has six connections, but since polarity reversal is a very common usage of DPDT switches, some variations of the DPDT switch are internally wired specifically for polarity reversal. These crossover switches only have four terminals rather than six. Two of the terminals are inputs and two are outputs. When connected to a battery or other DC source, the 4-way switch selects from either normal or reversed polarity. Such switches can also be used as intermediate switches in a multiway switching system for control of lamps by more than two switches.

== Slide switches ==
Slide switches are mechanical switches using a slider that moves (slides) from the open (off) position to the closed (on) position.

== Electronic switches ==
The term switch has since spread to a variety of solid state electronics that perform a switching function, but which are controlled electronically by active devices rather than purely mechanically. These are categorized in the article electronic switch. Electromechanical switches (such as the traditional relay, electromechanical crossbar, and Strowger switch) bridge the categorization.

== Other switches ==
- Centrifugal switch
- Company switch
- Crossbar switch
- Dead man's switch
- Fireman's switch
- Hall-effect switch
- Inertial switch
- Isolator switch
- Key switch
- Kill switch
- Latching switch
- Light switch
- Load control switch
- Membrane switch
- MEMS switch
- Optical switch
- Piezo switch
- Pull switch
- Push switch
- Sense switch
- Slotted optical switch
- Stepping switch
- Strowger switch
- Thermal switch
- Time switch
- Touch switch
- Transfer switch
- Zero speed switch

== See also ==
- Circuit breaker
- Commutator (electric)
- Contact resistance
- DIN rail
- Electric switchboard
- Fuse cutout
- RF switch matrix
- Switch access
- Switchgear
