= Push switch =

Momentary or non-latching switch

Push-to-break switch electronic symbol

Push-to-make switch electronic symbol

A push switch (button) is a momentary or non-latching switch which causes a temporary change in the state of an electrical circuit only while the switch is physically actuated. An automatic mechanism (i.e. a spring) returns the switch to its default position immediately afterwards, restoring the initial circuit condition. There are two types:

- A 'push to make' switch allows electricity to flow between its two contacts when held in. When the button is released, the circuit is broken. This type of switch is also known as a Normally Open (NO) Switch. (Examples: doorbell, computer case power switch, calculator buttons, individual keys on a keyboard)
- A 'push to break' switch does the opposite, i.e. when the button is not pressed, electricity can flow, but when it is pressed the circuit is broken. This type of switch is also known as a Normally Closed (NC) Switch. (Examples: Fridge Light Switch, Alarm Switches in Fail-Safe circuits)

Many push switches are designed to function as both 'push to make' and 'push to break' switches. For these switches, the wiring of the switch determines whether the switch functions as a 'push to make' or as a 'push to break' switch.

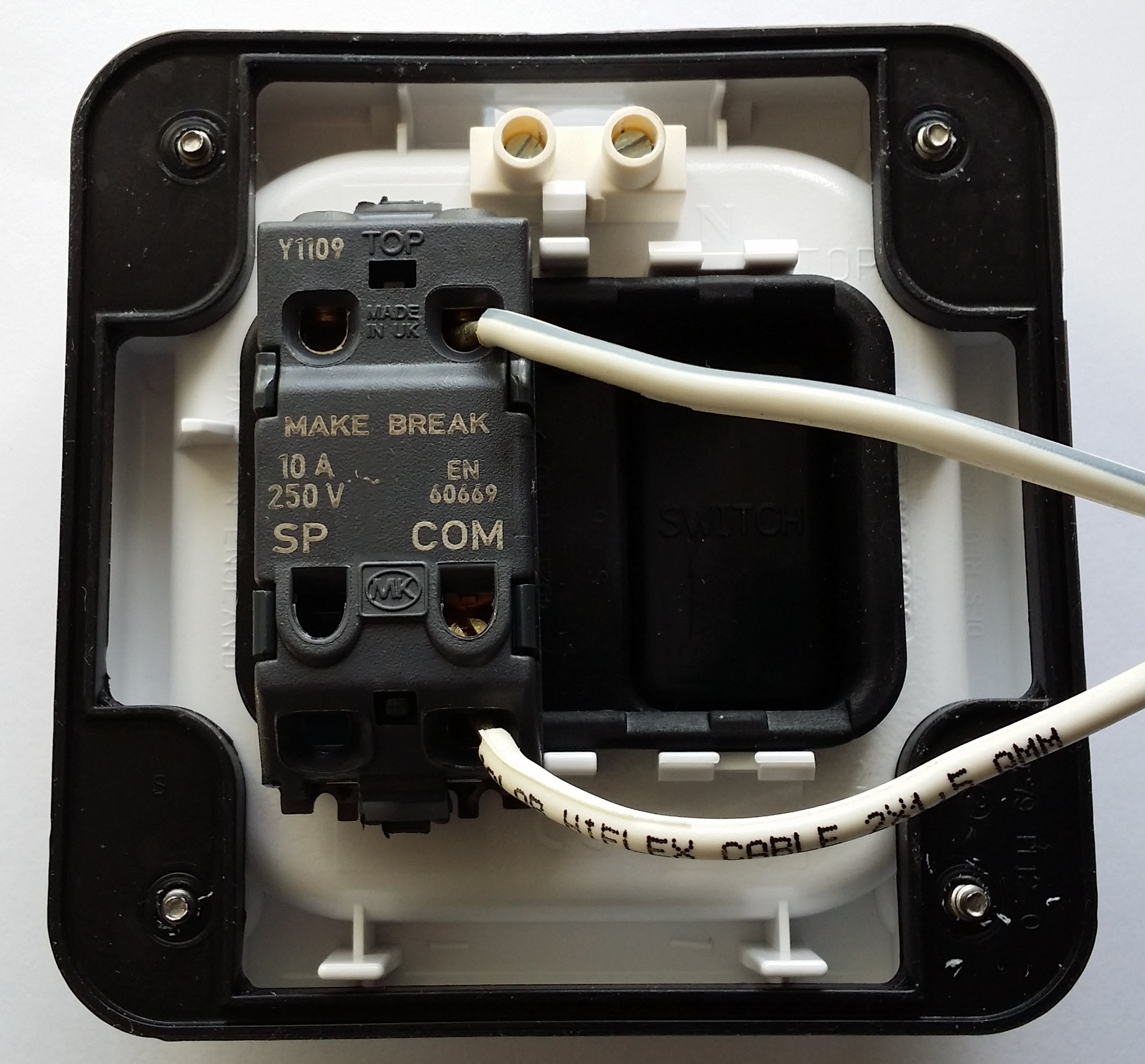
Commercially Available Push Switch – Wired up as a Push to Break Switch

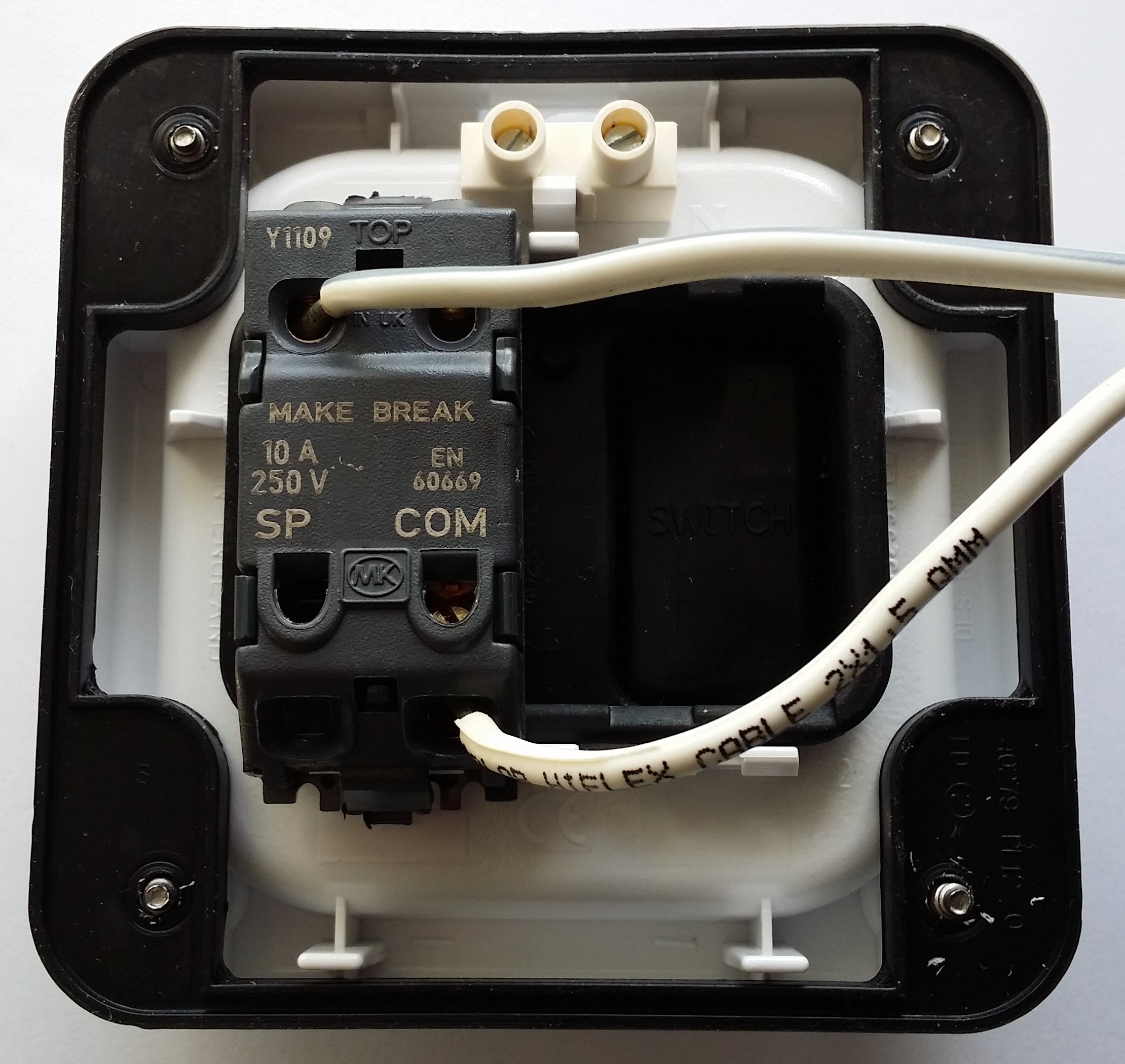
Commercially Available Push Switch – Wired up as a Push to Make Switch
