= Lobakuya =

Town and sub-prefecture in Ivory Coast

- Town and sub-prefecture
- Location in Ivory Coast
- Coordinates: 5°5′N 6°21′W
- Country: Ivory Coast
- District: Bas-Sassandra
- Region: Gbôklé
- Department: Sassandra

Population (2014)
  - Total: 67,969
- Time zone: UTC+0 (GMT)

Lobakuya is a town in south-western Ivory Coast. It is a sub-prefecture of Sassandra Department in Gbôklé Region, Bas-Sassandra District.

Lobakuya was a commune until March 2012, when it became one of 1,126 communes nationwide that were abolished.

In 2014, the population of the sub-prefecture of Lobakuya was 67,969.

== Villages ==
The seven villages of the sub-prefecture of Lobakuya and their population in 2014 are:

1. Balokuya (25,573)
2. Bréguiagui (4,127)
3. Karago (484)
4. Kérayo (488)
5. Labakuya (14,436)
6. Lobakuya (6,786)
7. Sahoua (16,075)
