= Médon =

Town and sub-prefecture in Ivory Coast

- Town and sub-prefecture
- Location in Ivory Coast
- Coordinates: 5°12′N 6°13′W
- Country: Ivory Coast
- District: Bas-Sassandra
- Region: Gbôklé
- Department: Sassandra

Population (2014)
  - Total: 16,575
- Time zone: UTC+0 (GMT)

Médon is a town in south-western Ivory Coast. It is a sub-prefecture of Sassandra Department in Gbôklé Region, Bas-Sassandra District.

Médon was a commune until March 2012, when it became one of 1,126 communes nationwide that were abolished.

In 2014, the population of the sub-prefecture of Médon was 16,575.

== Villages ==
The four villages of the sub-prefecture of Médon and their population in 2014 are:

1. Garoubré (5,179)
2. Gréguibré (3,685)
3. Inahiri (4,243)
4. Médon (3,468)
