= ZSS-FM =

Radio station

- Nassau; Bahamas
- Broadcast area: New Providence
- Frequency: 89.9 MHz
- Branding: Splash FM

Programming
- Format: gospel music

History
- Call sign meaning: ZS, the former ITU prefix under United Kingdom rule, plus an S for Splash

Technical information
- ERP: 20,000 watts
- Transmitter coordinates: 25°4′0″N 77°19′59″W (ZSS-FM); 26°32′25″N 77°03′45″W (ZSS-FM-2)
- Repeater: ZSS-FM-2 95.5 Marsh Harbour (5,000 watts)

ZSS-FM is a radio station in Nassau, Bahamas, broadcasting a gospel music format. The station has its primary transmitter (ZSS-FM 89.9 MHz) in Nassau, with a repeater (ZSS-FM-2 95.5 MHz) in Marsh Harbour.
