= Latching switch =

Type of electrical switch

A latching switch is a switch that maintains its state after being activated. A push-to-make, push-to-break switch would therefore be a latching switch – each time you actuate it, whichever state the switch is left in will persist until the switch is actuated again.

== Gallery ==
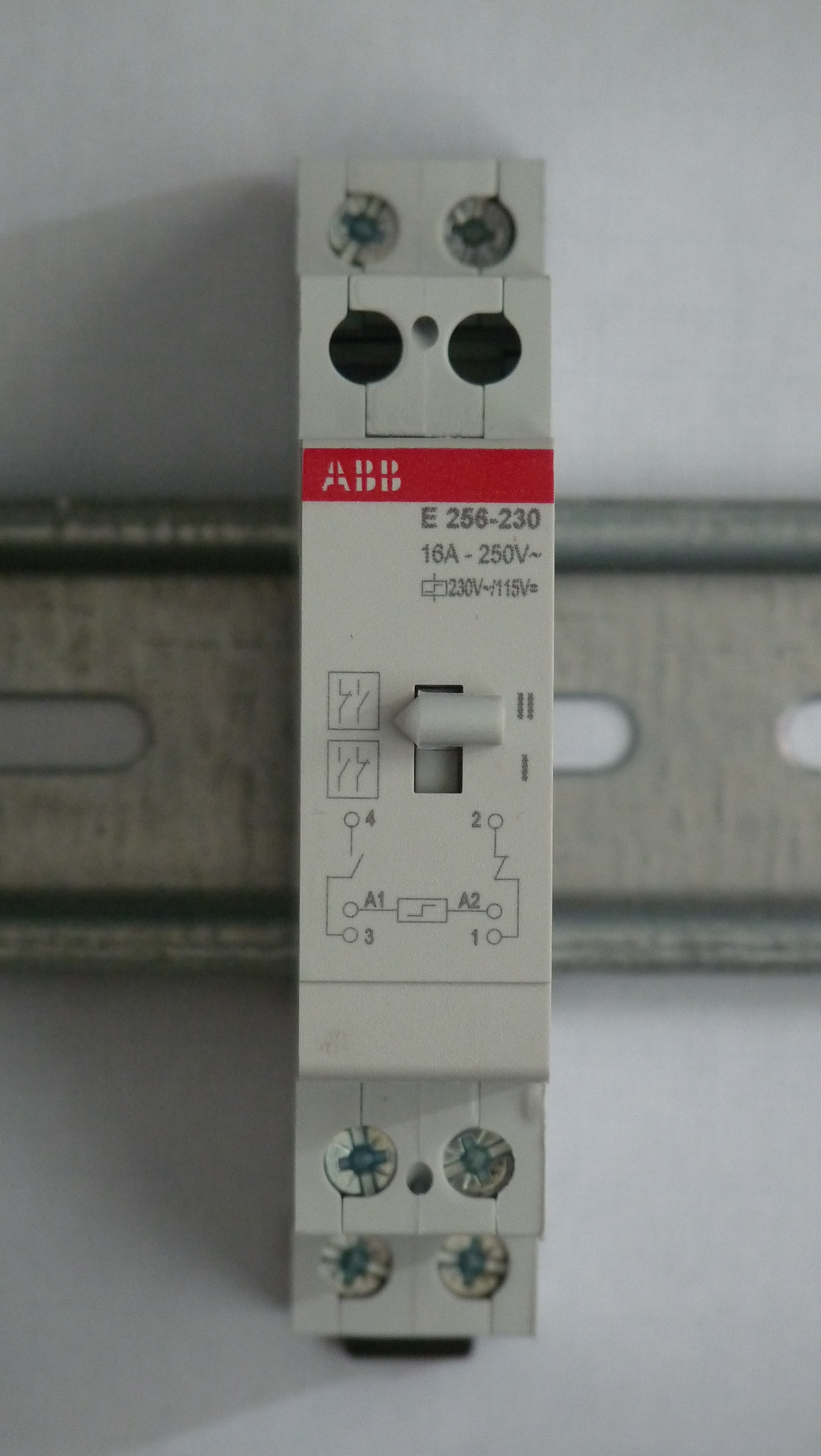
ABB E256 latching relay

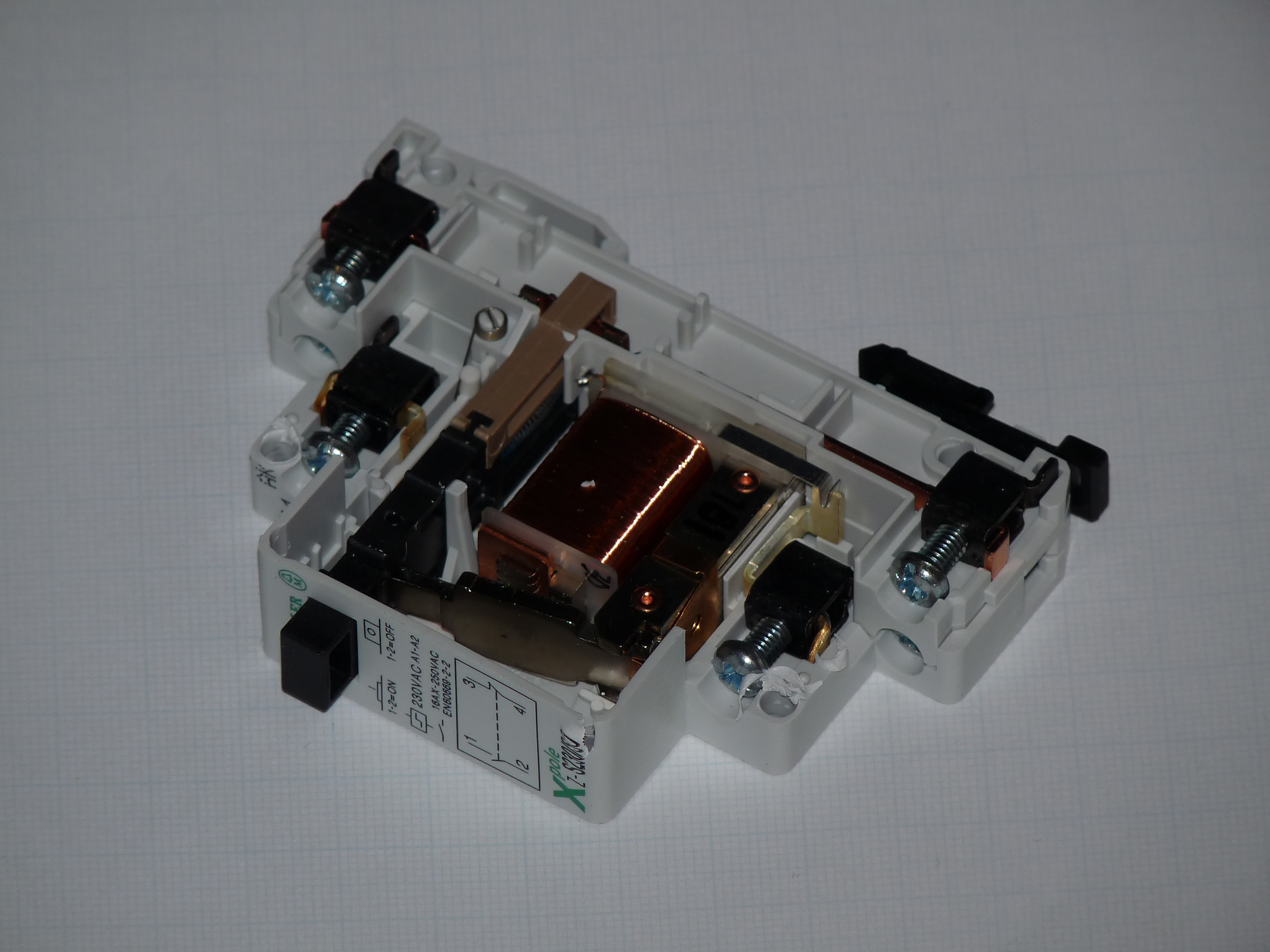
Moeller Z-S230 latching relay

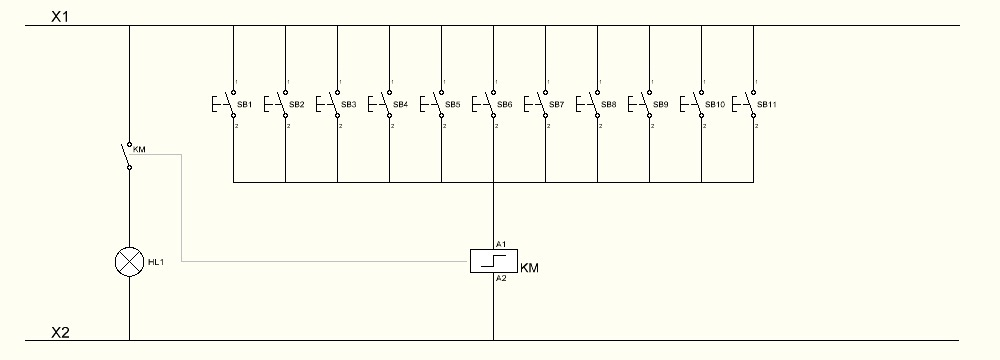
wiring diagram of latching switch

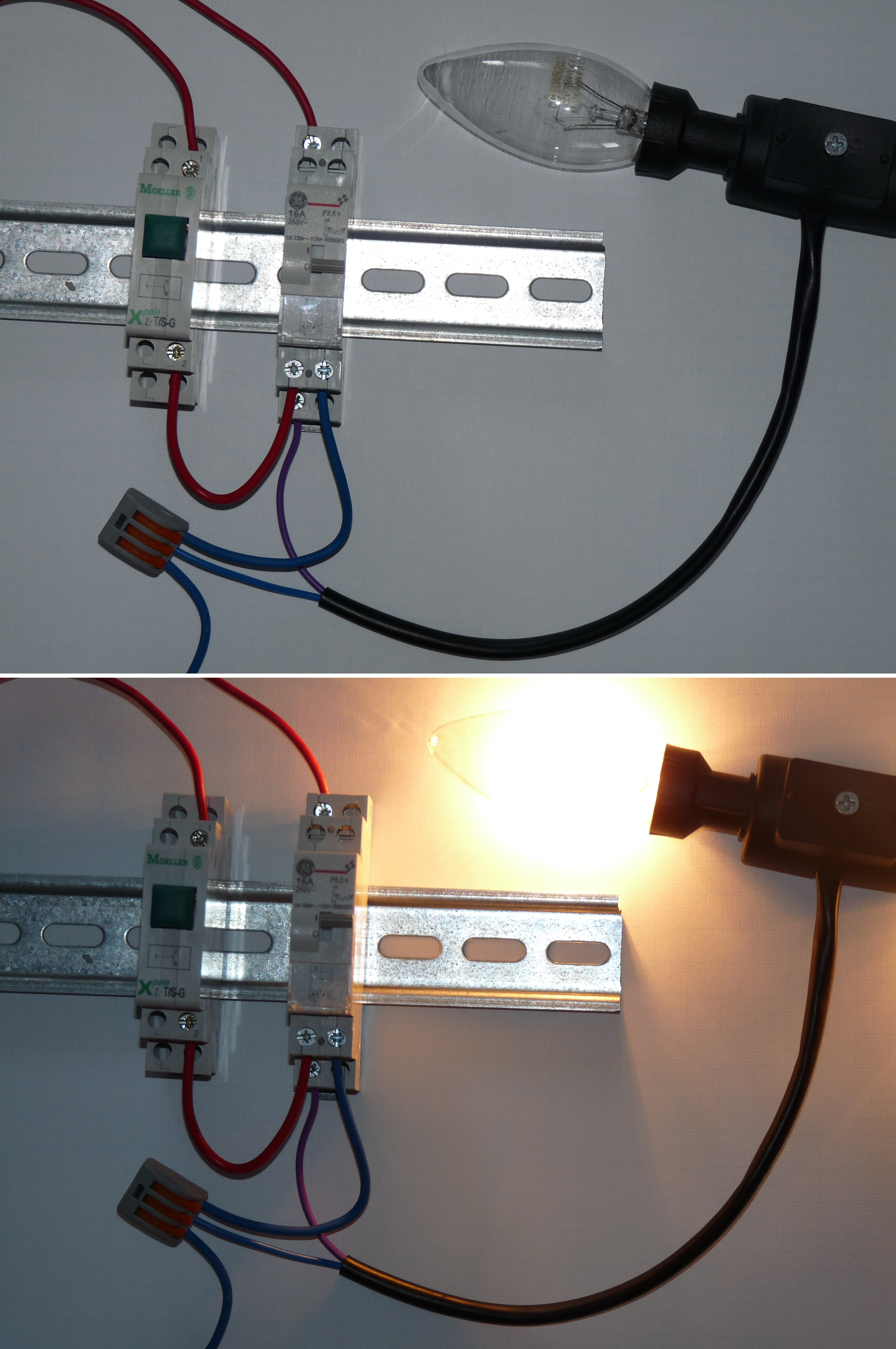
example of latching switch using GE PLS+ relay

== See also ==
- Latching relay
- Toggle switch
