= Sago, Ivory Coast =

Town and sub-prefecture in Ivory Coast

Sago Sagbe
- Town and sub-prefecture
- Location in Ivory Coast
- Coordinates: 5°16′N 5°56′W
- Country: Ivory Coast
- District: Bas-Sassandra
- Region: Gbôklé
- Department: Sassandra

Population (2014)
  - Total: 58,354
- Time zone: UTC+0 (GMT)

Sago (also known as Sagbe) is a town in southern Ivory Coast. It is a sub-prefecture of Sassandra Department in Gbôklé Region, Bas-Sassandra District.

Sago was a commune until March 2012, when it became one of 1,126 communes nationwide that were abolished.

In 2014, the population of the sub-prefecture of Sago was 58,354.

== Villages ==
The sixteen villages of the sub-prefecture of Sago and their population in 2014 are:

1. Adébem (5,155)
2. Badiéboué (988)
3. Gnago 1 (6,946)
4. Gnago 2 (7,997)
5. Gnégrouboué (1,474)
6. Gobroko (4,596)
7. Godjiboué (5,107)
8. Guédikpo (773)
9. Kpata-Abidou (3,728)
10. Lohiri-Godié (3,324)
11. Manaboué (309)
12. Sago (7,541)
13. Tétidou (1,276)
14. Tiazalé (3,234)
15. Trikpoko (2,804)
16. Zégréboué (3,102)
