= Dakpadou =

Town and sub-prefecture in Ivory Coast

- Town and sub-prefecture
- Location in Ivory Coast
- Coordinates: 5°14′N 6°4′W
- Country: Ivory Coast
- District: Bas-Sassandra
- Region: Gbôklé
- Department: Sassandra

Population (2014)
  - Total: 46,529
- Time zone: UTC+0 (GMT)

Dakpadou is a town in southern Ivory Coast. It is a sub-prefecture of Sassandra Department in Gbôklé Region, Bas-Sassandra District.

Dakpadou was a commune until March 2012, when it became one of 1,126 communes nationwide that were abolished.

In 2014, the population of the sub-prefecture of Dakpadou was 46,529.

== Villages ==
The 14 villages of the sub-prefecture of Dakpadou and their population in 2014 are:

1. Béyo (3,177)
2. Bolo 1 (5,440)
3. Bolo 2 (829)
4. Bolo 3 (963)
5. Dakpadou (11,437)
6. Gboville (362)
7. Kokoloppozo (4,739)
8. Lédjan ( 426 )
9. Madinatchè (1,753)
10. Niapidou (14,145)
11. Sadiadougou (483)
12. Safa-Manois (1,145)
13. Tchématché (928)
14. Yao-Appelakro (702)
