= Sassandra Airport =

Airport in Ivory Coast

- IATA: ZSS; ICAO: DISS

Summary
- Airport type: Public
- Serves: Sassandra
- Elevation AMSL: 203 ft / 62 m
- Coordinates: 4°55′40″N 6°7′58″W

Map

Runways
Direction	Length		Surface
Direction	ft	m	Surface
04/22	5,768	1,758	Unpaved
- Source: Google Maps

Sassandra Airport (IATA: ZSS, ICAO: DISS) is an airport serving Sassandra, Côte d'Ivoire.

== See also ==
- Transport in Côte d'Ivoire
