= Sassandra =

- Town, sub-prefecture, and commune
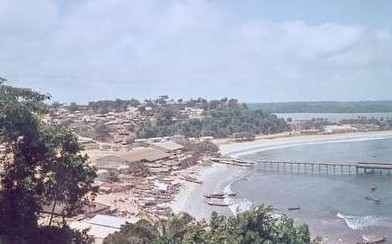
- A beach in Sassandra

- Location in Ivory Coast
- Coordinates: 4°57′N 6°5′W
- Country: Ivory Coast
- District: Bas-Sassandra
- Region: Gbôklé
- Department: Sassandra

Area
  - Total: 836 km^{2} (323 sq mi)

Population (2021 census)
  - Total: 87,945
  - Density: 105/km^{2} (272/sq mi)
  - Town: 26,608
- (2014 census)
- Time zone: UTC+0 (GMT)

Sassandra is a town in southern Ivory Coast. It is a sub-prefecture of and the seat of Sassandra Department. It is also a commune and the seat of Gbôklé Region in Bas-Sassandra District.

Sassandra lies on the Gulf of Guinea at the mouth of the Sassandra River. The town was founded by the Portuguese as Santo André and was later run by the British, then the French as a seaport for timber. The town declined in the 1960s after San Pédro's port was completed. Sassandra's main industry is now fishing.

Sassandra is known for its beaches and lighthouse, while the Gaoulou National Park lies nearby. It is served by Sassandra Airport.

In 2021, the population of the sub-prefecture of Sassandra was 87,945.

== Villages ==
The thirty eight villages of the sub-prefecture of Sassandra and their population in 2014 are:

1. Arokpa (363)
2. Bassa (492)
3. Batélébré 1 (94)
4. Brodjé (431)
5. Cocoplage (296)
6. Dabéda (169)
7. Gaoulou (12 184)
8. Gapé (318)
9. Grand-Dréwin (747)
10. Kadrokpa (1 683)
11. Lébléko (151)
12. Lékidou (63)
13. Misséhi (292)
14. Niani (839)
15. Niézéko (222)
16. Sassandra (26 608)
17. Siampaho Pk6 (855)
18. Vodiéko (286)
19. Akakro (863)
20. Dagbégo 1 (1 025)
21. Dagbégo 2 (2 042)
22. Gloplou Pk20 (496)
23. Godé (180)
24. Goviadou (39)
25. Guédio-Guédio (720)
26. Kadrokpa 2 (2 911)
27. Latéko (233)
28. Lipoyo (1 079)
29. Lohiri-Néyau (326)
30. Lossan Kouamékro (2 313)
31. Louga (889)
32. Niabably Pk 26 (3 323)
33. Niabayo (89)
34. Niéga (328)
35. Pauly-Brousse (6 530)
36. Pauly-Chantier (623)
37. Pauly-Plage (162)
38. Sialloukro (2 957)

== Climate ==
Sassandra has a tropical savanna climate (Köppen Aw) with year-round very high humidity and extreme heat discomfort. Sassandra sees two rainy seasons: the main rains occur from April to July, with a second shorter and lighter rain period from October to December. There are two very distinct dry seasons: a foggy, cloudy, slightly cooler dry season in August and September and a longer dry period dominated by the harmattan wind from the Sahara between mid-December and mid-March, resulting in clearer skies than during any other part of the year.

Climate data for Sassandra (1961–1990)
| Month | Jan | Feb | Mar | Apr | May | Jun | Jul | Aug | Sep | Oct | Nov | Dec | Year |
|---|---|---|---|---|---|---|---|---|---|---|---|---|---|
| Mean daily maximum °C (°F) | 30.1 (86.2) | 30.1 (86.2) | 31.0 (87.8) | 30.9 (87.6) | 29.8 (85.6) | 27.9 (82.2) | 27.1 (80.8) | 26.5 (79.7) | 27.5 (81.5) | 28.5 (83.3) | 29.6 (85.3) | 29.5 (85.1) | 29.0 (84.2) |
| Daily mean °C (°F) | 26.1 (79.0) | 26.9 (80.4) | 27.0 (80.6) | 26.5 (79.7) | 26.5 (79.7) | 25.4 (77.7) | 24.5 (76.1) | 24.2 (75.6) | 24.6 (76.3) | 25.5 (77.9) | 26.2 (79.2) | 26.1 (79.0) | 25.8 (78.4) |
| Mean daily minimum °C (°F) | 22.3 (72.1) | 23.0 (73.4) | 23.2 (73.8) | 23.4 (74.1) | 23.1 (73.6) | 22.0 (71.6) | 22.7 (72.9) | 22.0 (71.6) | 22.0 (71.6) | 22.4 (72.3) | 22.8 (73.0) | 22.6 (72.7) | 22.6 (72.7) |
| Average rainfall mm (inches) | 15.8 (0.62) | 35.7 (1.41) | 52.6 (2.07) | 96.9 (3.81) | 235.1 (9.26) | 529.1 (20.83) | 191.4 (7.54) | 32.1 (1.26) | 43.6 (1.72) | 84.5 (3.33) | 119.6 (4.71) | 72.8 (2.87) | 1,509.2 (59.43) |
| Mean monthly sunshine hours | 208.3 | 192.4 | 211.4 | 218.3 | 182.5 | 112.1 | 128.8 | 123.8 | 154.4 | 216.0 | 224.2 | 206.2 | 2,178.4 |
Source: NOAA
