= Zero speed switch =

Zero speed switches (ZSS) also known as Speed Actuating Sensing Switches are used to detect whether a rotating shaft is turning (even at very slow speeds) in various machines, conveyors, power plants, and in industries involving the production of cement, sugar, textiles, paper, etc. Zero speed switches mainly use electromechanical, electronic, or magnetic proximity technologies. Electromechanical speed switches are direct coupled, speed-indicating devices which open or close a set of contacts mechanically, as a function of the rotational speed of the switch shaft. Electronic zero speed switches are direct-coupled, speed-indicating devices that open or close a set of contacts through a relay and electronic circuit. User-defined settings and the rotational input speed of the shaft determine the speed at which an electronic zero-speed switch trips.

A small timing delay may be required for avoiding nuisance tripping during running as well as during starting of the machine. This is taken care of in the electronics of the ZSS.

== Specifications ==
Zero speed switches differ in terms of performance specifications, mounting styles, and features. Important specifications include operating range or the input shaft speed, trip set-point, operating temperature range, operating conditions, field adjustability, operating voltage, and relay contact rating. For various applications, zero speed switch suppliers can provide zero speed switches that are explosion proof, weather proof or dust proof.

There are two types of ZSS, based on power supply provision. One is the interrupted power type, in which the power supply is given to the ZSS only for the duration for which the power is going to the motor of that machine. In the second type, the power supply is continuously given to the ZSS. Installation of the zero speed switches depends on the shaft or rotating part construction, where the speed has to be monitored.
