= Sassandra Department =

Coordinates: 4°57′N 6°5′W

Sassandra Department Département de Sassandra
- Department
- Location in Ivory Coast. Sassandra Department has had these boundaries since 2008.
- Country: Ivory Coast
- District: Bas-Sassandra
- Region: Gbôklé
- 1969: Established as a first-level subdivision
- 1980: Divided to create Soubré Dept
- 1988: Divided to create San-Pédro and Tabou Depts
- 1997: Converted to a second-level subdivision
- 2008: Divided to create Guéyo Dept
- 2011: Converted to a third-level subdivision
- Departmental seat: Sassandra

Government
  - Prefect: Ernest Boni Koffi

Area
  - Total: 4,340 km^{2} (1,680 sq mi)

Population (2021 census)
  - Total: 353,228
  - Density: 81.4/km^{2} (211/sq mi)
- Time zone: UTC+0 (GMT)

Sassandra Department is a department of Gbôklé Region in Bas-Sassandra District, Ivory Coast. In 2021, its population was 353,228 and its seat is the settlement of Sassandra. The sub-prefectures of the department are Dakpadou, Grihiri, Lobakuya, Médon, Sago, and Sassandra.

== History ==
Sassandra Department was created in 1969 as one of the 24 new departments that were created to take the place of the six departments that were being abolished. It was created by taking territory from both Centre-Ouest Department and Sud Department. Using current boundaries as a reference, from 1969 to 1980 the department occupied the same territory as Bas-Sassandra District, with the exception of Fresco Department (ie, all of Nawa, San-Pédro, and Gbôklé Regions save Fresco Department).

In 1980, Sassandra Department was divided to create Soubré Department. What remained was divided into three parts in 1988 in order to create San-Pédro and Tabou Departments.

In 1997, regions were introduced as new first-level subdivisions of Ivory Coast; as a result, all departments were converted into second-level subdivisions. Sassandra Department was included in Bas-Sassandra Region.

Sassandra Department was divided a third time in 2008 when Guéyo Department was created from it.

In 2011, districts were introduced as new first-level subdivisions of Ivory Coast. At the same time, regions were reorganised and became second-level subdivisions and all departments were converted into third-level subdivisions. At this time, Sassandra Department became part of Gbôklé Region in Bas-Sassandra District.

=== Maps of historical boundaries ===
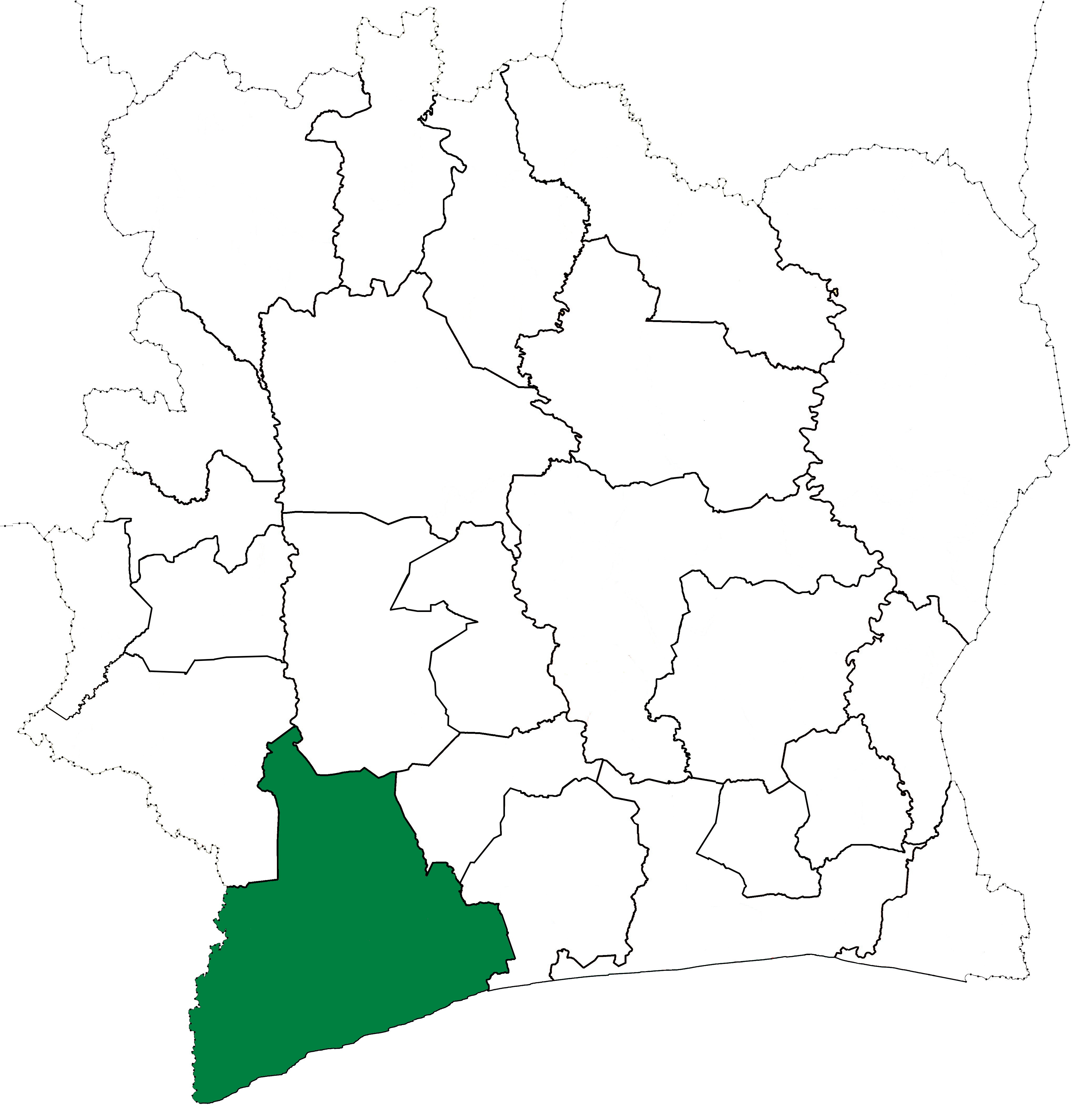
Sassandra Department upon its creation in 1969. It kept these boundaries until 1980, but other departments began to be divided in 1974.

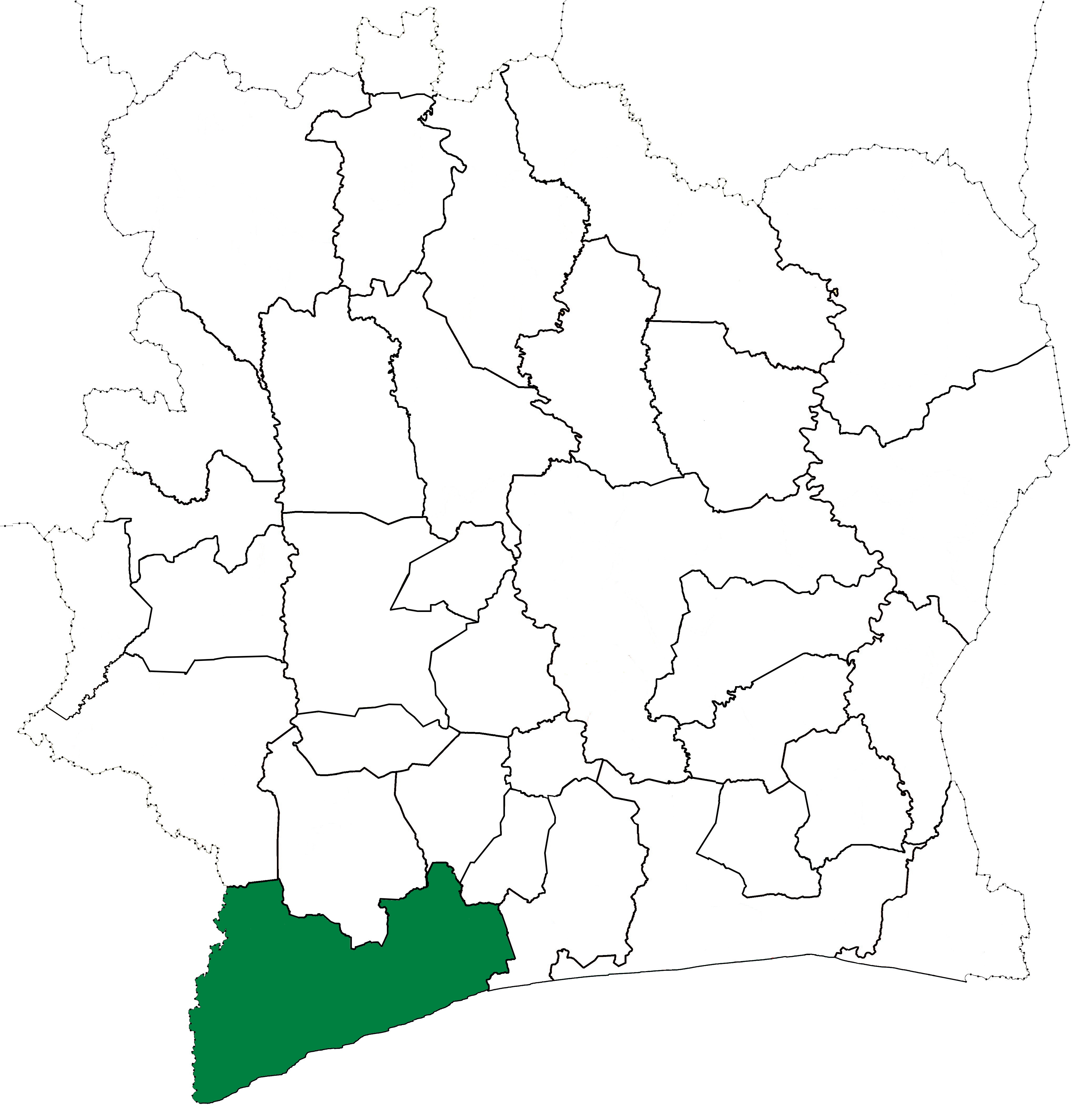
Sassandra Department from 1980 to 1988.

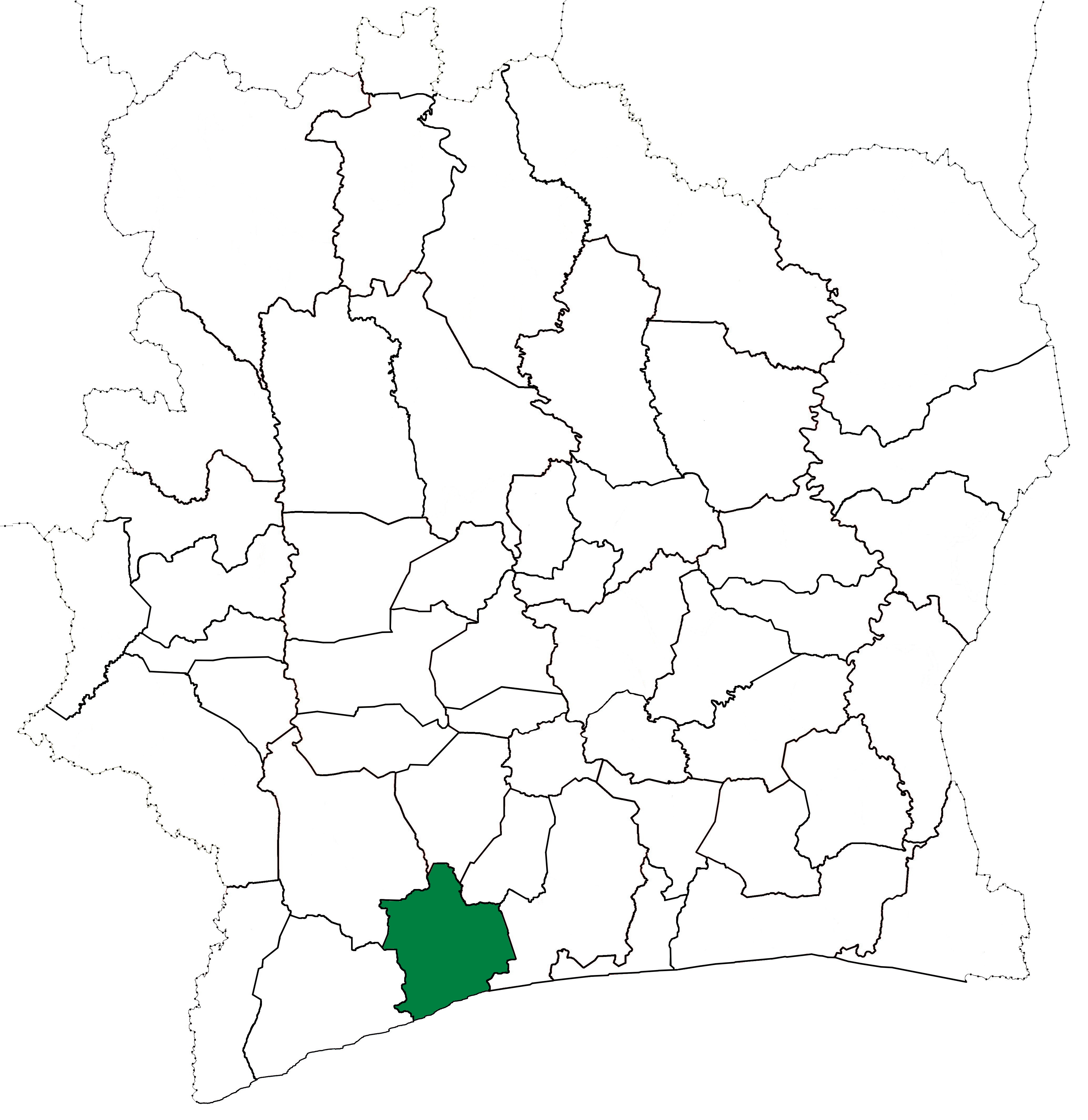
Sassandra Department from 1988 to 2008. (Other departments began to be divided in 1995.)

In 2014, the population of the sub-prefecture of Sassandra was 72,221.

== Villages ==
The villages of the sub-prefecture of Sassandra and their population in 2014 are:

1. Arokpa (363)
2. Bassa (492)
3. Batélébré 1 (94)
4. Brodjé (431)
5. Cocoplage (296)
6. Dabéda (169)
7. Gaoulou (12 184)
8. Gapé (318)
9. Grand-Dréwin (747)
10. Kadrokpa (1 683)
11. Lébléko (151)
12. Lékidou (63)
13. Misséhi (292)
14. Niani (839)
15. Niézéko (222)
16. Sassandra (26 608)
17. Siampaho (855)
18. Vodiéko (286)
19. Akakro (863)
20. Dagbégo 1 (1 025)
21. Dagbégo 2 (2 042)
22. Gloplou (496)
23. Godé (180)
24. Goviadou (39)
25. Guédio-Guédio (720)
26. Kadrokpa 2 (2 911)
27. Latéko (233)
28. Lipoyo (1 079)
29. Lohiri-Néyau (326)
30. Lossan Kouamékro (2 313)
31. Louga (889)
32. Niabably (3 323)
33. Niabayo (89)
34. Niéga (328)
35. Pauly-Brousse (6 530)
36. Pauly-Chantier (623)
37. Pauly-Plage (162)
38. Sialloukro (2 957)
