= Light switch =

Type of switch in electrical wiring

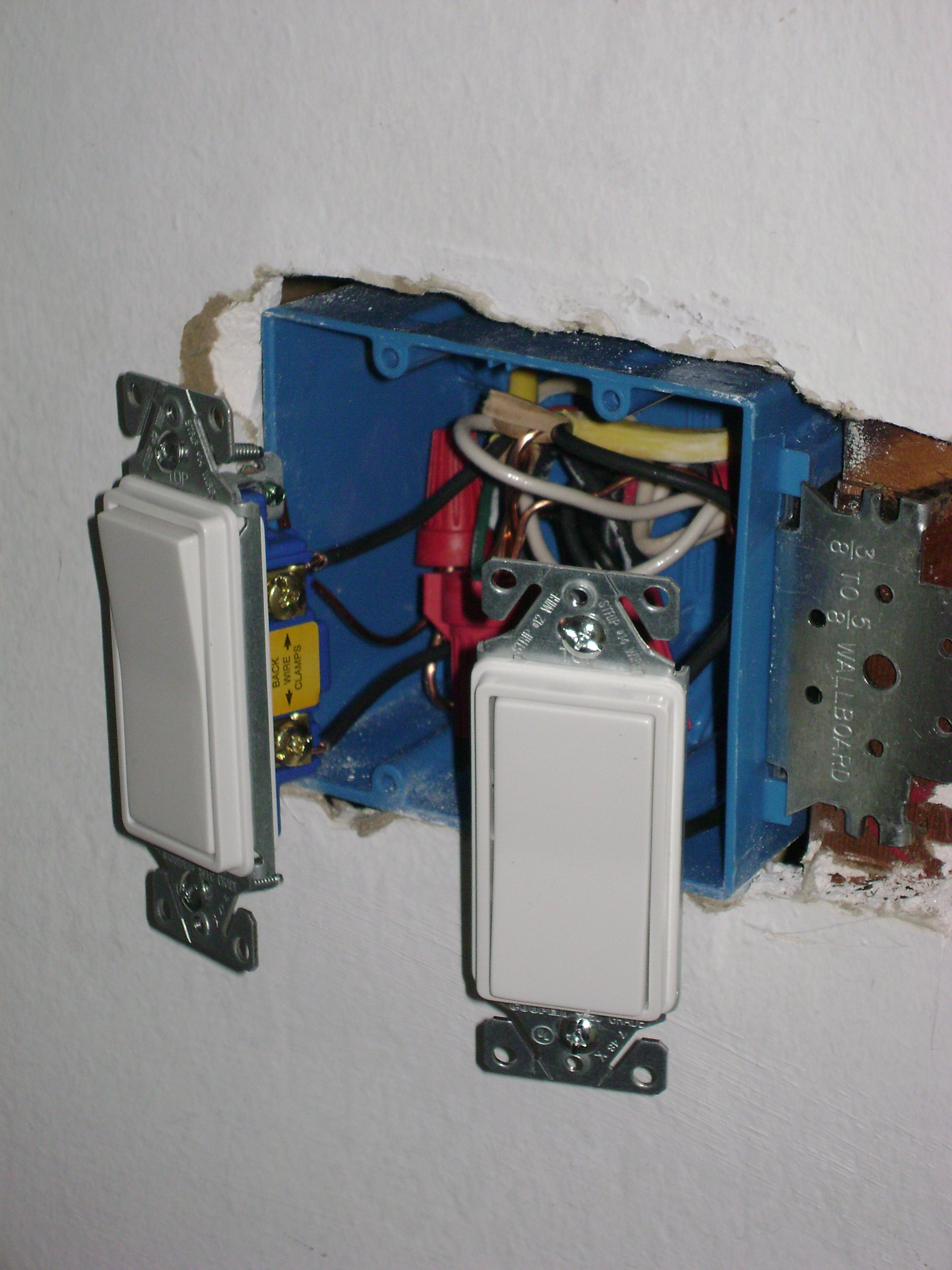
Two decorator-style rocker switches and wiring, as installed in the United States. Shown here will be fastened to this recessed, non-metallic box, then a cover plate is installed. This "double gang" (two unit) installation uses non-metallic-sheathed cable and twist-on wire connectors.

In electrical wiring, a light switch is a switch most commonly used to operate electric lights, permanently connected equipment, or electrical outlets. Portable lamps such as table lamps may have a light switch mounted on the socket, base, or in-line with the cord. Manually operated on/off switches may be substituted by dimmer switches that allow controlling the brightness of lamps as well as turning them on or off, time-controlled switches, occupancy-sensing switches, and remotely controlled switches and dimmers. Light switches are also found in flashlights, vehicles, and other devices.

== History, culture, examples, and style ==
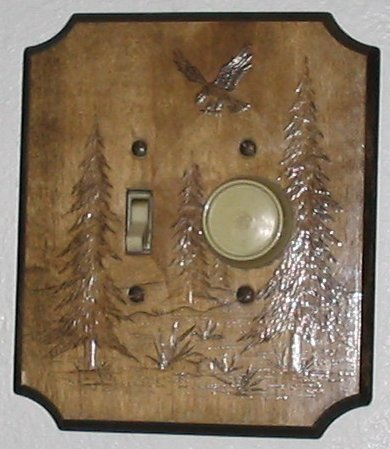
Two light switches in one box. The switch on the right is a dimmer switch. The switch box is covered by a decorative plate.

The first light switch employing "quick-break technology" was invented by John Henry Holmes in 1884 in the Shieldfield district of Newcastle upon Tyne. The "quick-break" switch overcame the problem of a switch's contacts developing electric arcing whenever the circuit was opened or closed. Arcing would cause pitting on one contact and the build-up of residue on the other, and the switch's useful life would be diminished. Holmes' invention ensured that the contacts would separate or come together very quickly, however much or little pressure was exerted by the user on the switch actuator. The action of this "quick break" mechanism meant that there was insufficient time for an arc to form, and the switch would thus have a long working life. This "quick break" technology is still in use in almost every ordinary light switch in the world today, numbering in the billions, as well as in many other forms of electric switch.

The toggle light switch was invented in 1916 by William J. Newton.

As a component of an electrical wiring or home wiring system, the installation of light switches is regulated by some authority concerned with safety and standards. In different countries the standard dimensions of the wall mounting hardware (boxes, plates, etc.) may differ. Since the face-plates used must cover this hardware, these standards determine the minimum sizes of all wall mounted equipment. Hence, the shape and size of the boxes and face-plates, as well as what is integrated, varies from country to country.

The dimensions, mechanical designs, and even the general appearance of light switches have changed slowly over time. Switches typically remain in service for many decades, often being changed only when a portion of a house is rewired. It is not unusual to see century-old light switches still in functional use. Manufacturers introduce various new forms and styles, but for the most part decoration and fashion concerns are limited to the face-plates or wall-plates. Even the "modern" dimmer switch with knob is at least forty years old, and in even the newest construction the familiar toggle and rocker switch formats predominate.

=== Orientation ===
The direction which represents "on" also varies by country. In the US, Canada, and Finland, it is usual for the "on" position of a toggle switch to be "up", whereas in many other countries such as the UK, Ireland, and other European countries as well as India, Australia, New Zealand (Commonwealth countries), Egypt, and China, it is "down". (In multiway switching, the correspondence between a single switch's state and whether lights are on or off depends on the state of the other switch[es] in the circuit.)

== Design ==
The switches may be single or multiple, designed for indoor or outdoor use. Optional extras may include dimmer-controls, environmental protection, weather and security protection. In residential and light commercial lighting systems, the light switch directly controls the circuit feeding the lamps. In larger lighting systems, for example warehouses or outdoor lighting systems, the required current may be too high for a manual switch. In these systems light switches control lighting contactors, a relay that allows the manual light switch to operate on a lower current, with smaller wiring than would be required in the main lighting circuit.

In the UK, putting 13-ampere BS 1363 sockets on a lighting circuit is discouraged (although not outright prohibited), but 2-ampere or 5-ampere BS 546 outlets are often put on lighting circuits to allow control of free-standing lamps from the room's light switches. In North American site-built and mobile homes, often living rooms and bedrooms have a switched receptacle for a floor or table lamp. Such receptacles are referred to as switched outlets or half-hot outlets.

== Variations on design ==
=== Push button ===
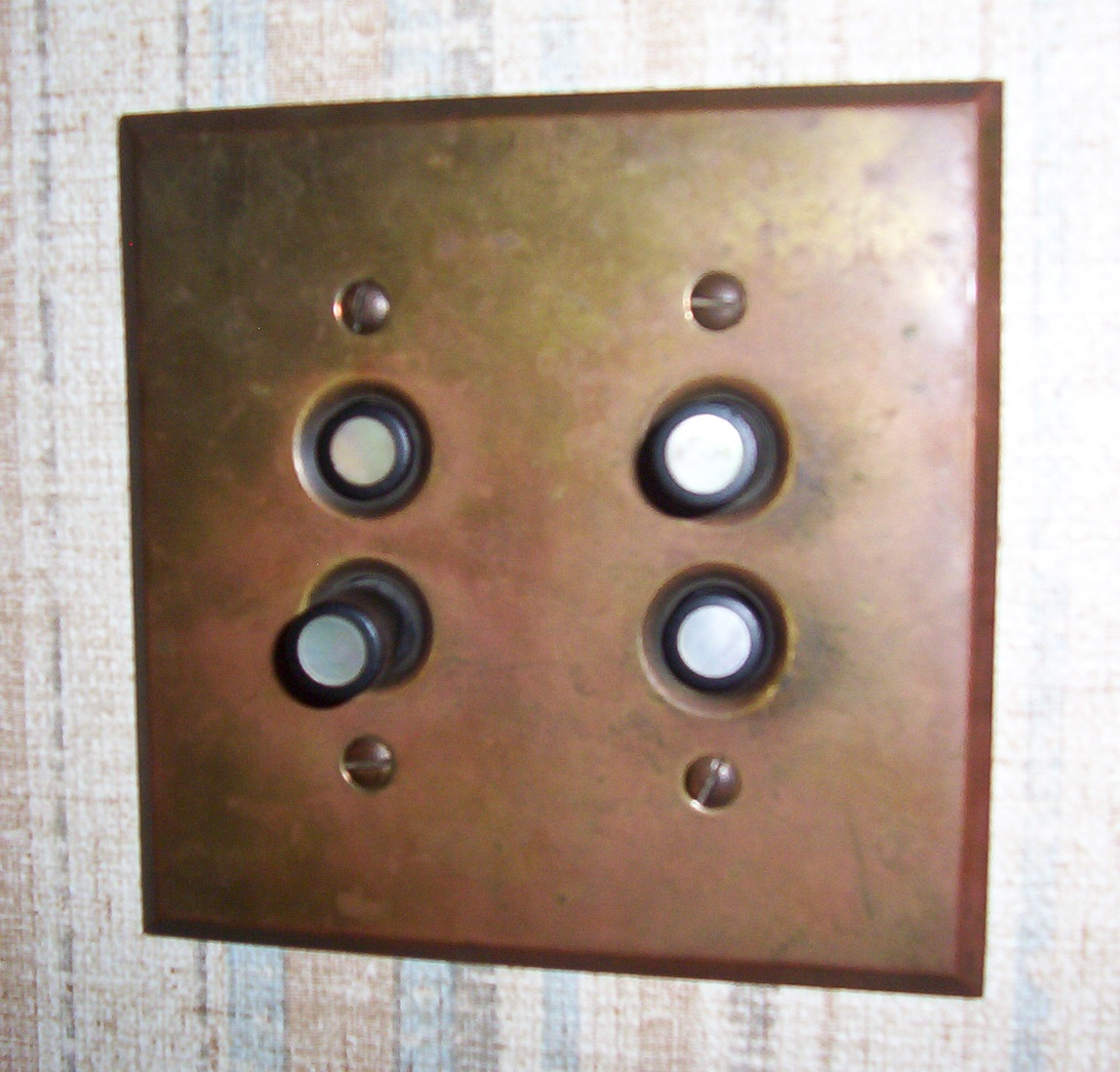
Vintage push-button light switches

The push-button light switch has two buttons: one that closes the contacts and one that opens the contacts. Pushing the raised button opens or closes the contacts and pops out the previously depressed button so the process can be reversed. In the U.S., the buttons were commonly black; the "on" button typically had a white mother-of-pearl (real or simulated) inlay to indicate its function. By convention, the switch was customarily installed with the "on" button on top. Push-button switch reproductions are available on the market today for vintage or authentic styling.

=== Toggle ===
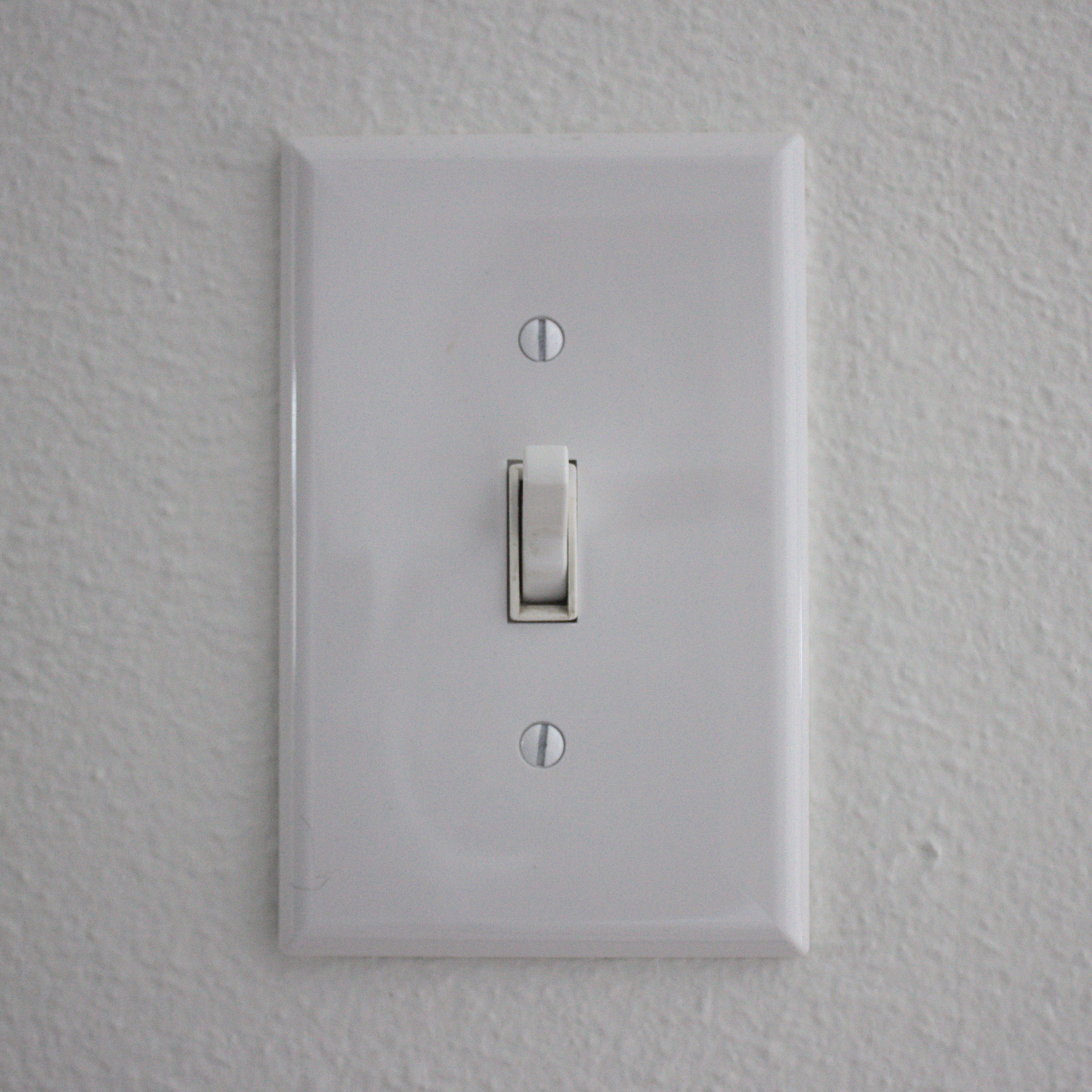
A Toggle Light Switch

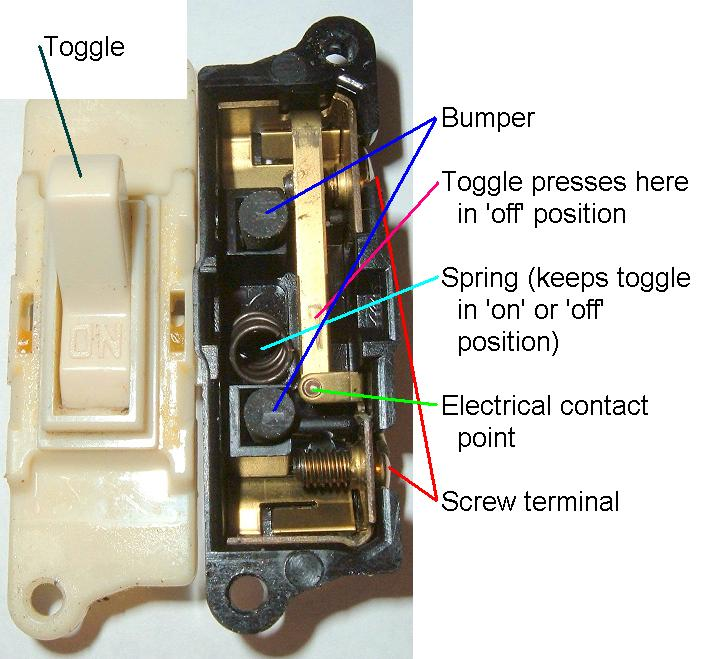
Internal components of a toggle switch

The toggle mechanism provides "snap-action" through the use of an "over-center" geometry. The design was patented in 1916 by William J. Newton and Morris Goldberg. The switch actuator does not control the contacts directly, but through an intermediate arrangement of springs and levers. Turning the actuator does not initially cause any motion of the contacts, which in fact continue to be positively held open by the force of the spring. Turning the actuator gradually stretches the spring. When the mechanism passes over the center point, the spring energy is released and the spring, rather than the actuator, drives the contacts rapidly and forcibly to the closed position with an audible "snapping" sound. This mechanism is safe, reliable, and durable, but produces a loud snap or click.

=== Illuminated switch ===
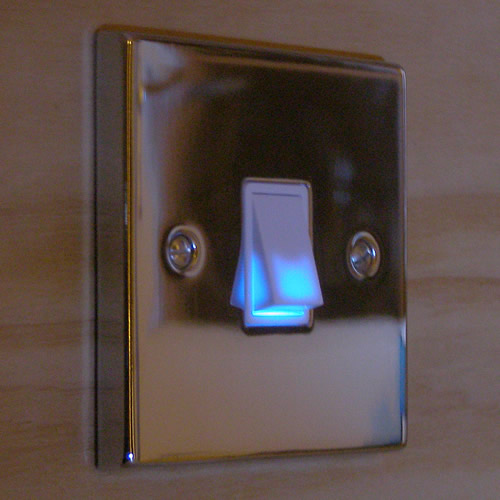
A UK illuminated rocker switch in the off position

Illuminated switches incorporate a small neon lamp or LED, allowing the user easily to locate the switch in the dark. Household illuminated switches were introduced in the mid-1950s.

Single-pole illuminated switches derive the power to energize their in-built illuminating source (usually, a "neon" lamp) from the current passing through the lamp(s) which they control. Such switches work satisfactorily with incandescent lamps, halogen lighting, and non-electronic fluorescent fixtures, because the small current required for the switch's illuminating source is too small to produce any visible light from such devices controlled by the illuminated switch. However, if they control only compact fluorescent lamps (CFLs) and/or LED lamps, the small amount of current required to energize the lighting source within switch also slowly charges the internal input capacitor in the electronic ballast of the CFL or LED until the voltage across it rises to the point where it produces a brief discharge through the CFL. This cycle may repeat indefinitely, resulting in repetitive brief flashing of the lamp(s) (and the light inside the switch) while the illuminated switch is in the "off" position.

=== Rocker ===
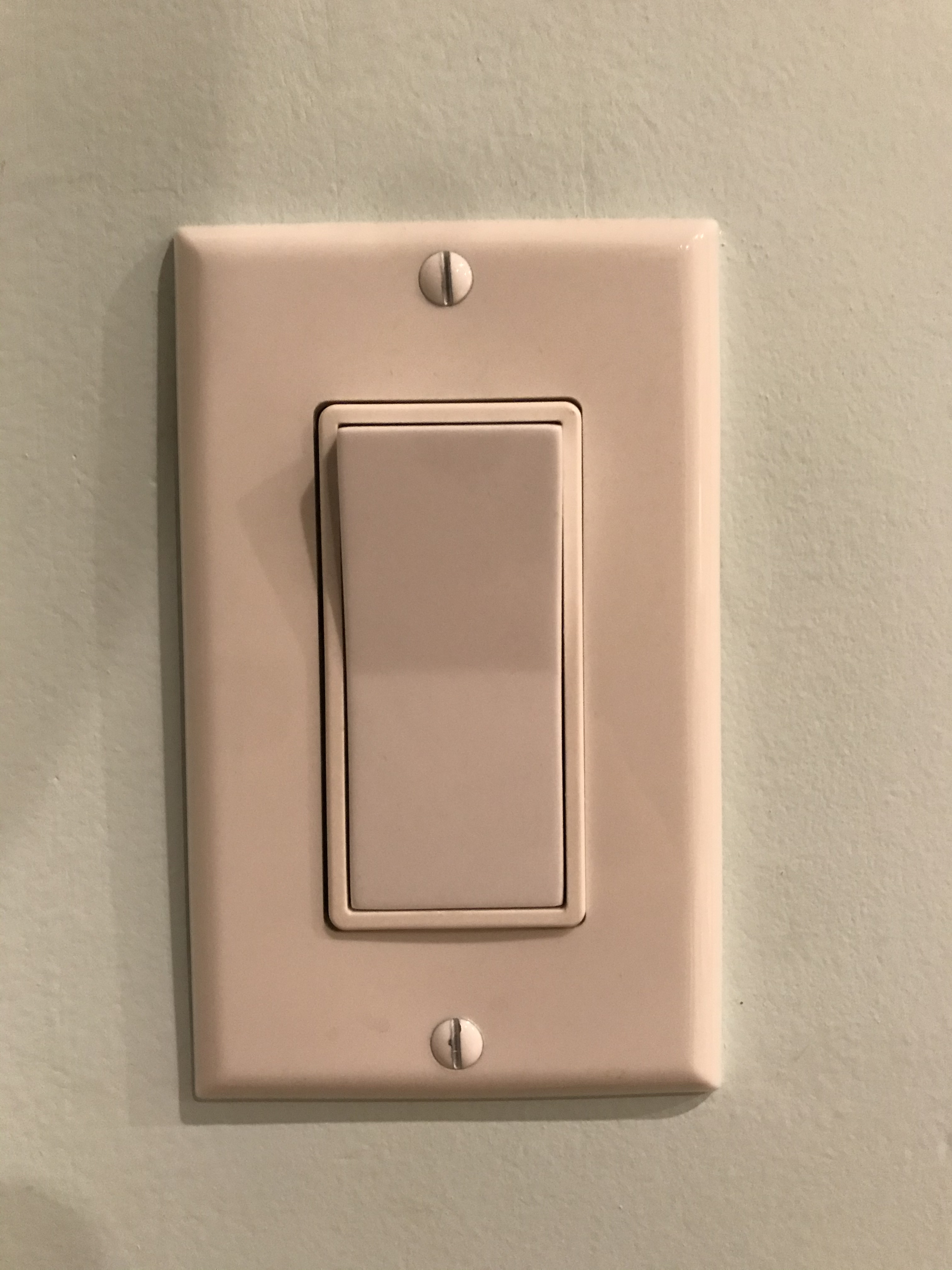
A rocker switch

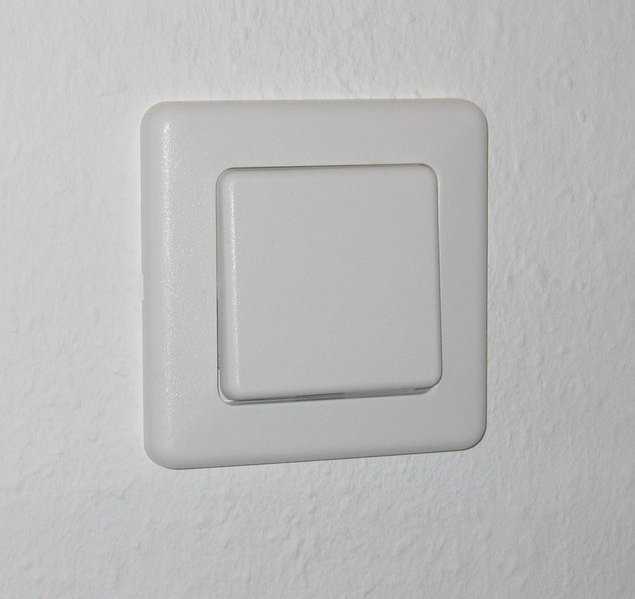
A European style rocker switch

An alternative design to the toggle switch is the rocker switch. Large switches of this design are commonly known in the United States as "decorator" or "Decora" style. "Decora" is a trademark of Leviton, and the term in recent years has become a genericized trademark in the United States for any rocker light switch regardless of brand. Switches of this design sit almost flush with the wall plate, and are activated by "rocking" a flat, broad lever, rather than pushing a short protruding actuator up or down.

In Europe, Brazil, Hong Kong, Malaysia, Singapore, and India this type is near-universal.

=== Australian rocker switches ===
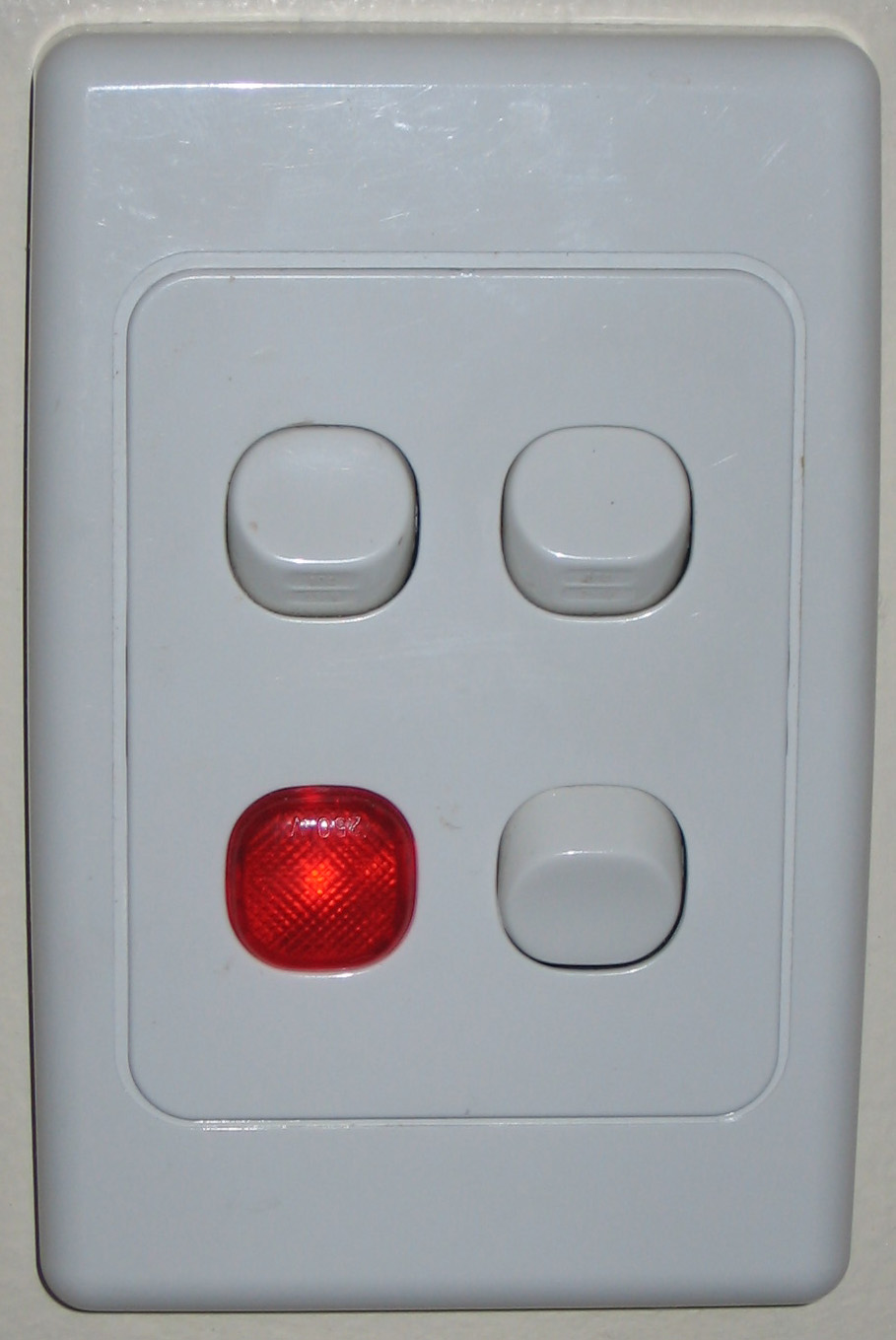
3 Australian light switches and a "neon" indicator—in a 4-gang wall-plate. The lower switch is in the "on" or "down" position.

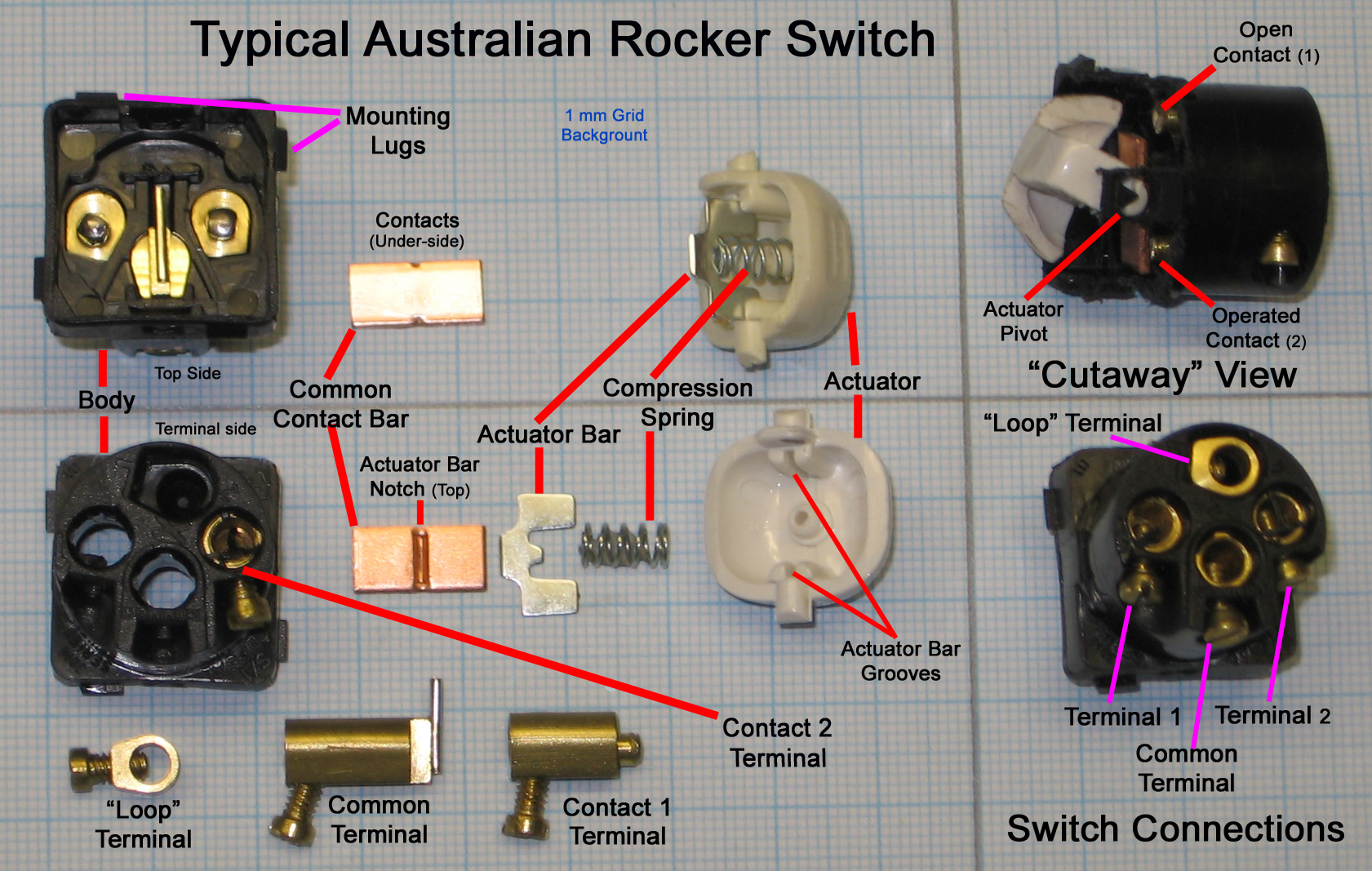
Two Australian rocker switches (disassembled), together with a cutaway view, and a view of the switch connections

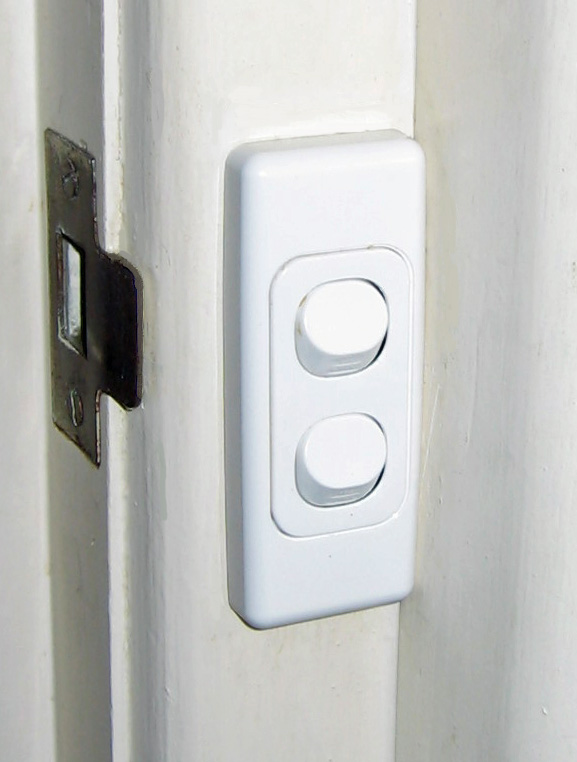
An Australian architrave-mounted 2-gang switch plate and switches.

In Australia and New Zealand, a small rocker switch is almost universally used, in the form of a 16 mm (0.63 in) switch mechanism, which is mounted from behind into a wall-plate—attaching via mounting lugs, as shown in the photo on the left. A slightly larger "cover plate", supplied with the wall-plate, or additional to it, then clips over the assembly, as an additional insulating barrier covering the deep set wall-plate mounting screws - which are "deep set" to prevent inadvertent human contact. The "cover plate" can be removed without the use of tools, such as when wall painting is required.

While larger "decorator" style switches are readily available in Australia, the advantage of the smaller mechanisms is that wall-plates are available to mount from one to six individual switch mechanisms, or other correspondingly sized "mechanisms" - such as dimmers and indicator lights - in the same space as one (or two) switches of larger design could be mounted. Since the mechanisms are small, they can also be mounted into "architrave" plates, for mounting in positions where it is not possible to mount a "standard" sized wall-plate. An example is shown in the picture below on the right. All of the switch mechanisms have no exposed metal parts requiring grounding (earthing). While switches, wall-plates, and cover plates from different manufacturers tend not to be interchangeable, switch mechanisms of this type have been available in Australia since 1951.

The keystone module system for extra-low voltage electrical jacks (patented in 1975) is somewhat similar in appearance to these modules, but the design of the keystone mountings are different, and keystone modules can be removed without a tool. (A similar system, but with bigger switches, is used in Italy.)

As shown in the disassembly photo, the switch actuator pivots in two holes in the sides of the plastic switch body. An actuator bar slides in two grooves inside the actuator, pressed down by a compression spring into a notch in the common contact bar. The common contact bar is free to rock on a small diameter rod, welded to the common terminal. However, because of the pressure applied by the compression spring, the common contact bar will always be held against one of the two contacts.

When the actuator is moved, mechanical energy is stored in the compression spring until the actuator passes its mid-position. At that time, the common contact bar is forced in the opposite direction by the compression spring, acting via the actuator bar, thus breaking the connection with the existing contact and making connection with the other contact. The common contact bar is made of copper, with an inlay of harder contact metal on the underside. While it is free to move the required distance lengthwise, it is constrained from moving sideways by the construction of the molded plastic body.

The screw terminals are hollow and allow up to at least three 1 mm (CSA) wires, twisted together, to be inserted to a depth of up to 10 millimetres (0.39 in) and secured with a set screw. The contact terminal set screws are installed at a slight angle to allow easier screwdriver access after the switch mechanism has been installed into a wall-plate - before fixing the wall-plate to the wall. Also shown is a "loop" connection terminal. This terminal plays no part in the action of the switch but, because there is available space, it is provided as an insulated terminal for joining other wires, if required (such as the neutral wires). Each Australian rocker switch mechanism is actually a single-pole, double-throw (SPDT) Switch, also known as a "two-way switch", and has three terminals.

A switch of basically the same design is also used on Australian power outlet wall-plates. It is now extremely rare to find any other type of switch in Australian homes, although the Australian Wiring Standard AS 3112 does not forbid other types. While many variations of Australian designs and cover plates are available, some designers and renovators may import UK- and European-designed switches when they desire a particular finish. However, while standard Australian wall mounting plates have the same dimensions as those used in North America, they have different dimensions from those used in the UK or Europe.

Switches (and other mechanisms) of this Australian design series are currently available in the UK (and other countries), together with wall-plates appropriate to the mounting standards of the countries concerned.

For a short time, Australian rocker switches were exported to the United States in the 1960s. Although the switches had adequate ratings for usage on 120 V circuits and had advantages of compactness and distinctive appearance, they failed to establish themselves in the American market.

=== Tamper resistant ===
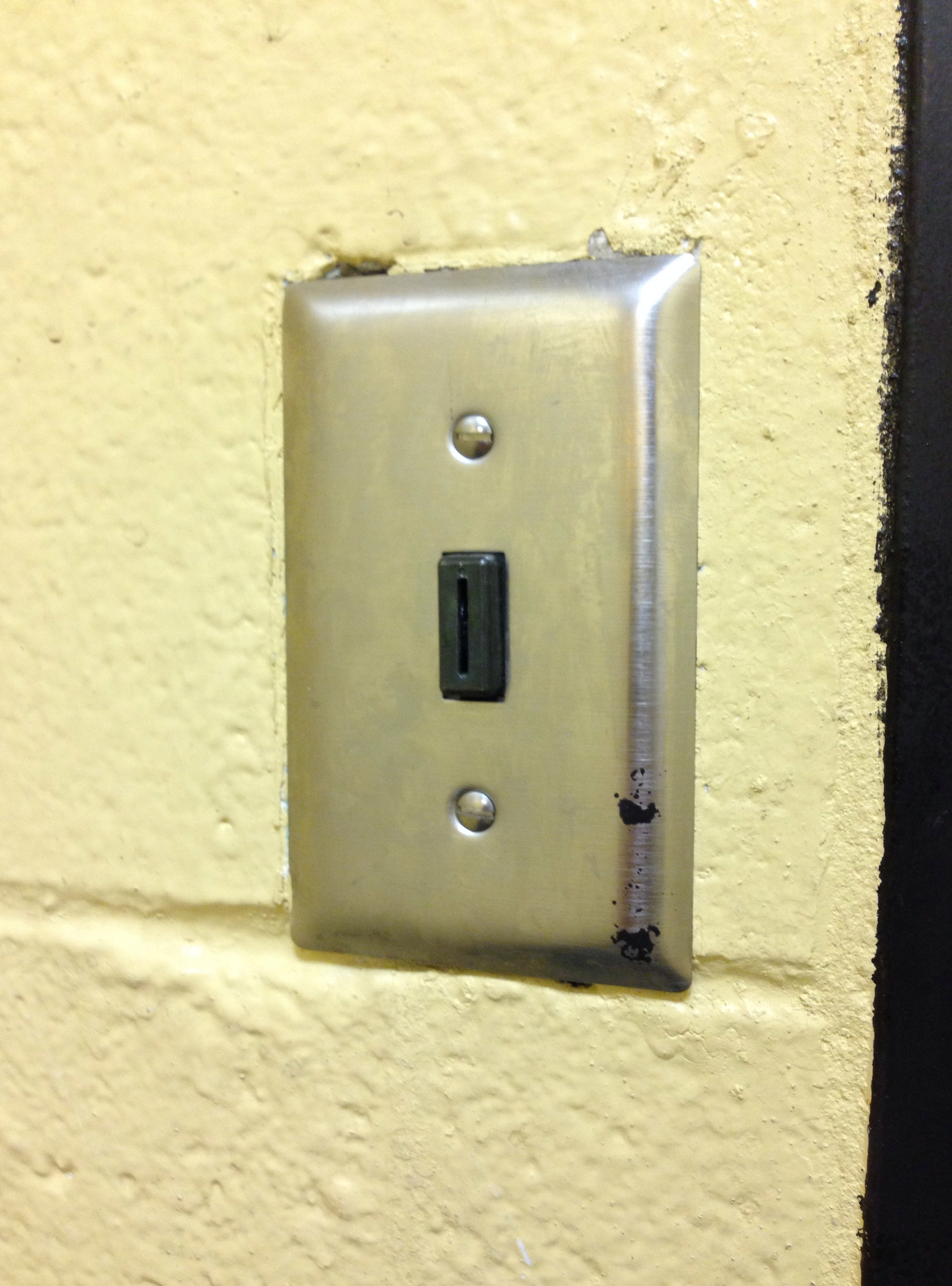
Tamper-resistant switch

Where lighting circuits must not be accidentally switched off, for example, corridor and restroom lighting controls in public buildings such as schools, a tamper-resistant switch may be installed. These require a key to operate and so discourage casual or accidental operation of the switch.

=== Voltage class ===
In North American commercial and industrial lighting installations, lighting installed on 480Y/277 V 3-phase circuits uses voltages higher than the rating of common 120 V switches.

=== Mercury switch ===
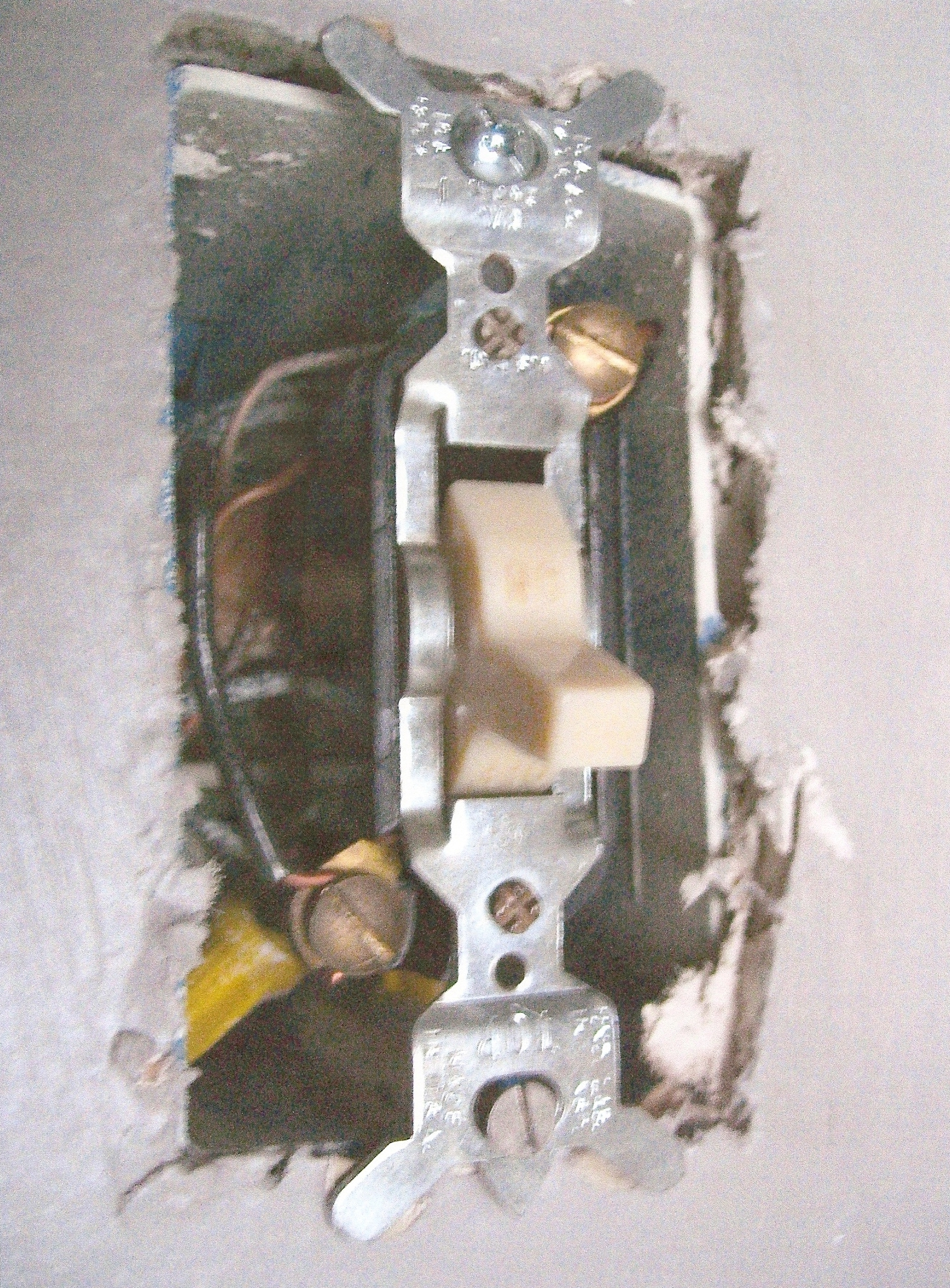
Mercury light switch from General Electric c. 1960, 120 V 15 A

Around the middle of the 20th century, "quiet" switches were introduced that used mercury to make the connection, avoiding the loud snap made by the spring-loaded toggle switches that were then the norm. One form of mercury light switch uses a sealed glass vial that is tipped by the toggle lever, causing a drop of liquid metallic mercury to roll from one end to the other, bridging a pair of contacts to complete the circuit. Another style of mercury light switch uses a metal wheel with an insulator separating the two halves that has a hole which allows the mercury to connect either side of the wheel in only one position.

Some of these switches were also equipped with a neon lamp connected across the contacts, and thus in series with the electrical load. This caused the indicator to glow faintly when the switch was off, as an aid to finding the switch in a dark room.

By the 1970s, other quiet switch designs that did not require mercury (and were thus simpler and cheaper to produce) came into widespread use, gradually replacing both conventional "snap" toggle switches and mercury-based quiet switches.

=== Pull-chain or pull-cord ===
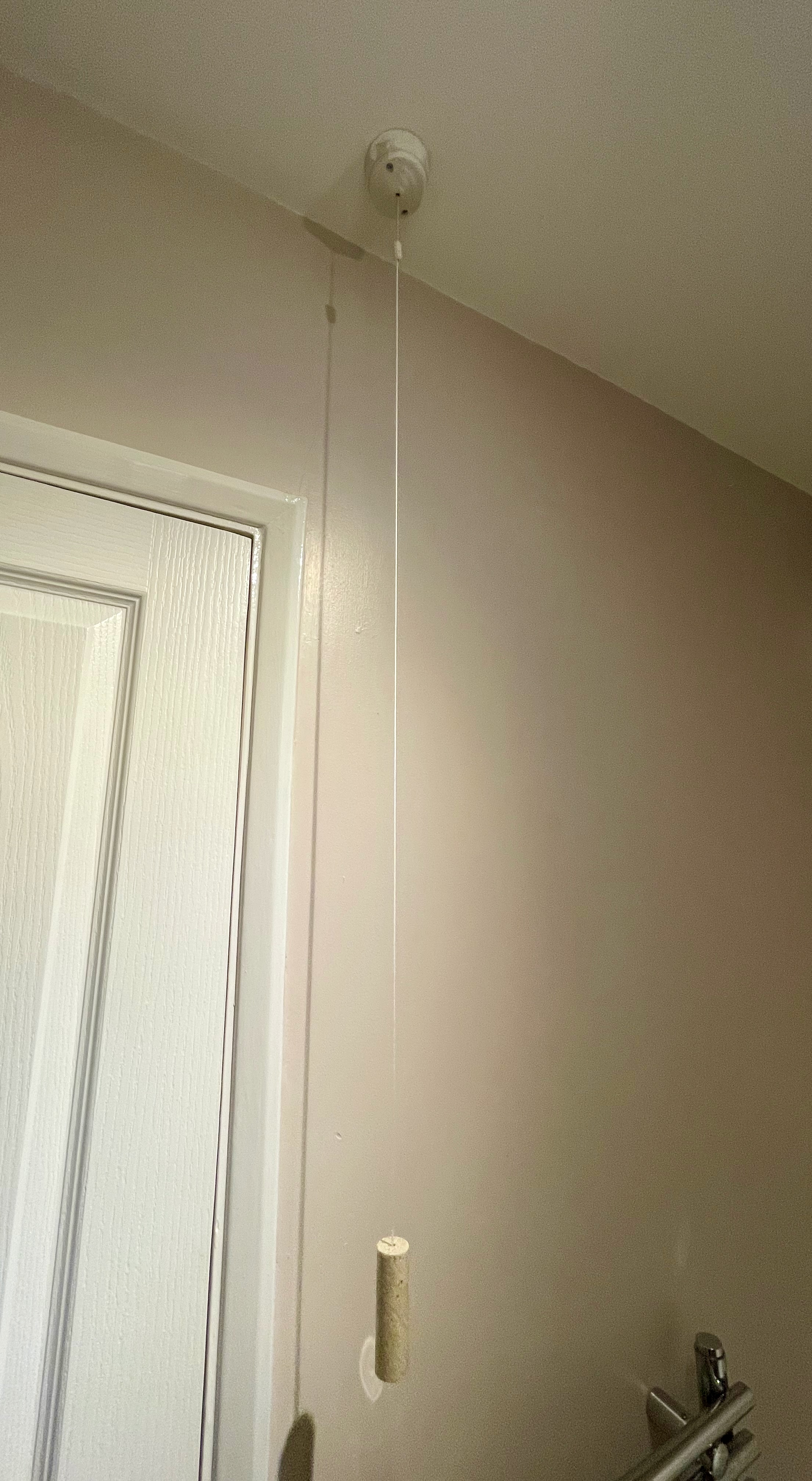
An example of a British corded pull switch

A light switch combined with a light socket is sometimes installed in basement or utility areas of homes. The switch is operated by a pull chain or cord. It is also possible to have the cord-operated switch separate from the light socket, which is particularly common in British bathrooms. Until 2001, UK wiring regulations required that all bathroom switches were operated by pull cords.

=== Floor switch ===
Also called foot switch. It is a type of switch for tall floor lamps, mounted on the power cord, usually stays on the floor and it is operated by foot. It is also used for other small home appliances, like fans or heaters (usually higher ratings).

=== Power cord mounted ===
This type of switch is mounted on the power cord, both in middle or at the end. They are light weight, and they are used mainly for low power devices, like table lamps, table fans, radios and many other low power devices. Usually, they are single pole single throw but can also double pole single throw. They can be mounted either in the middle of the plug and consumer or they may be mounted at the end of the cable. There are also more sophisticated cord mounted switches, like multiple switching (for lamps with more than one bulb, or fans with more speeds, in this case they have one input and 2 or more outputs), variators and dimmers (light dimmers, electric pillows and mattresses or some fans with more speeds). Some older heaters may also use such switches, but with higher ratings. Usually their current rating is between 0.5 A, mainly limited to low powered lamps at mains voltage, up to 6 or even 10 A (like heaters) . Higher current ratings may also allow usage in high current but low voltage (6-24 V) applications.

=== Dimmer switch ===
A dimmer switch, properly called a dimmer control, contains a solid-state circuit to allow changing the brightness by reducing the average voltage or waveform applied to the lamp.

=== Electronic switches ===
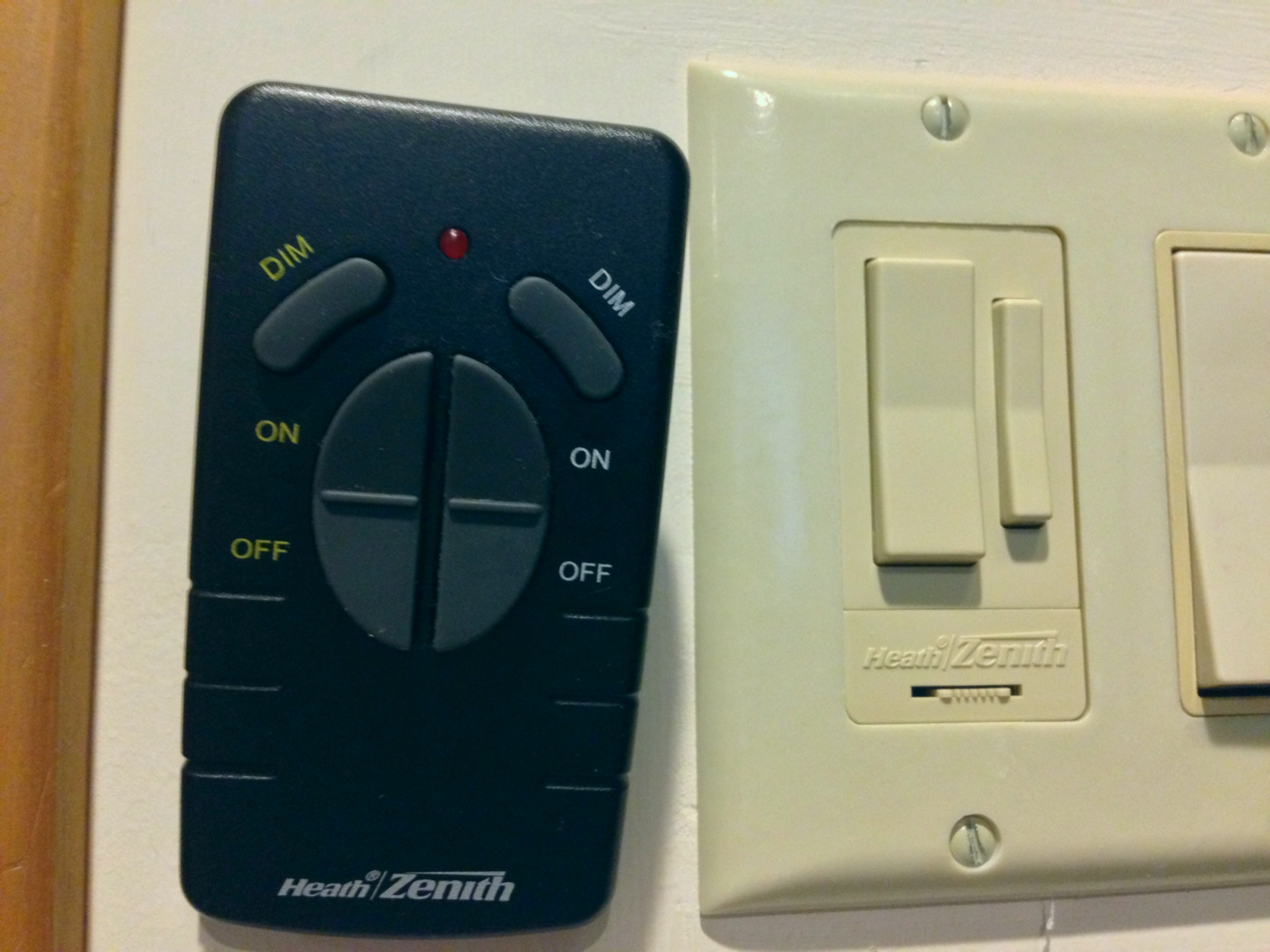
Dimmer with RF-based remote control

In principle, it is easy to design silent switches in which the mechanical contacts do not directly control the current but simply signal a solid-state device such as a thyristor to complete the circuit. Many variations on this theme have been created and marketed. "Touch-plate" devices can be operated by touching or merely waving a hand near the switch. Touch switches have no moving parts and electronically switch the light circuit. As of 1986, these remain specialty items. Electronic switches provide flexibility in terms of different interfaces for their operations, such as touch plates, soft-touch controls, pressure or light sensor-based control, interactive touch-screens (which are widely used in aircraft for lighting control), and others.

Public buildings such as hospitals frequently save energy by using motion detector switches, also known as occupancy sensors. The occupancy sensors can also be used in residential applications such as in bathrooms, garages, and hallways.

A wireless light switch provides remote control of lighting using a hand-held transmitter. While the controlling device may be a unit dedicated to this purpose, increasingly such switches may be controlled by the technology (such as Bluetooth or Wi-Fi) now found in smartphones.

Wired remote control of lighting switches is also possible using, for example, X10 signaling over the power wires.

== Multiway switching ==
Two or more light switches can be interconnected to allow control of lighting from, for example, two ends of a long hallway or landings at the upper and lower landings of a flight of stairs. Multiway switching is done using special switches that have additional contacts.

== Materials ==
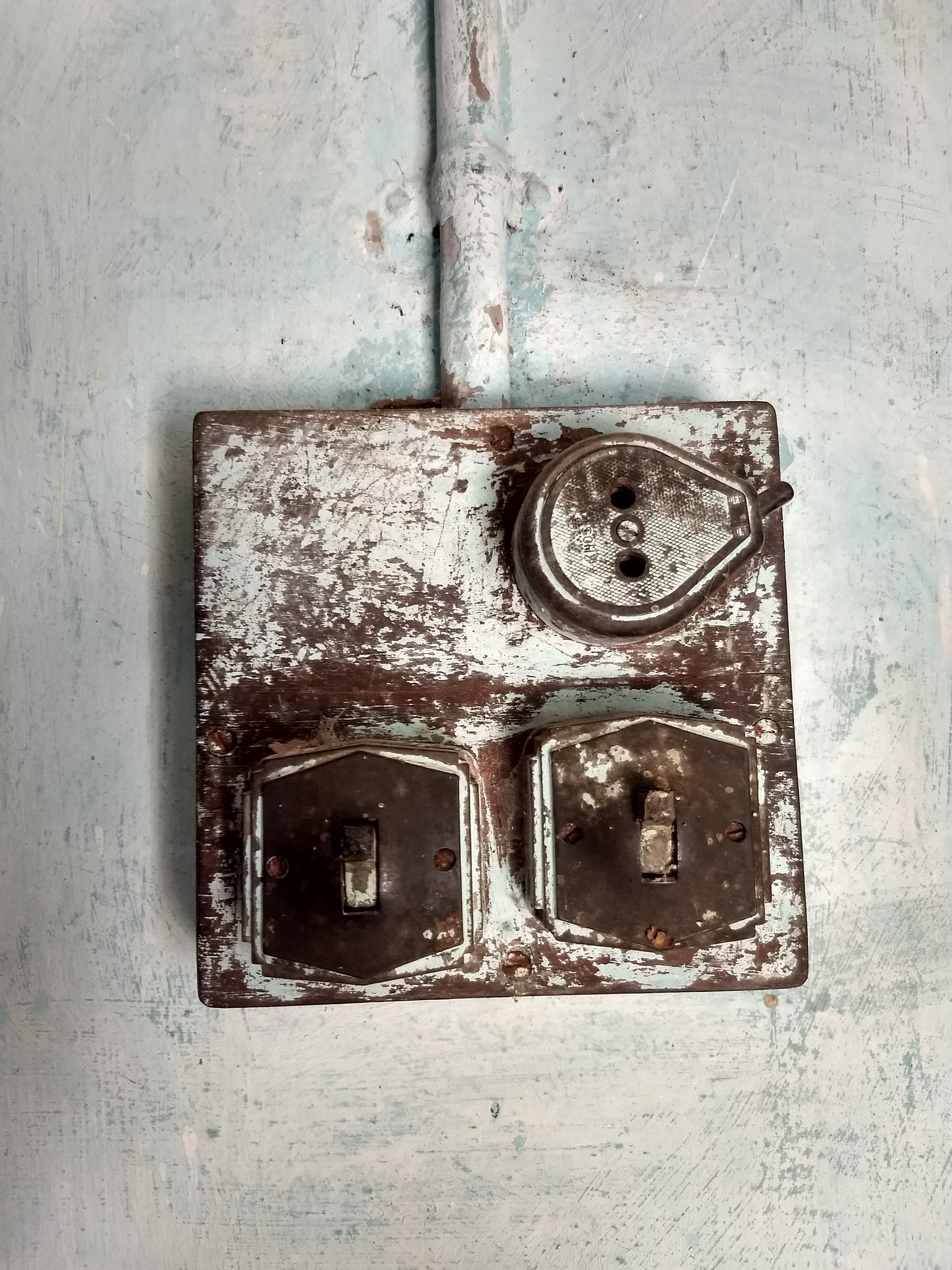
Old tumbler switch made of Bakelite

Earlier switches were made of porcelain were surface-mounted and used a rotary mechanism. Later, more durable Bakelite and Ebonite was used. Today they are made of modern plastics, like polycarbonate or fire-resistant ABS. Some switches may also be manufactured from other plastics like polyamide, polypropylene or PVC but these are usually limited to wire mounted switches (like night lamp switches), mainly due to reduced weight. Most such switches are used with low power devices such as table lamps, up to about 2 amperes.

== See also ==
- Touch-sensitive lamp
