= Vandal-resistant switch =

Type of switch meant to be durable

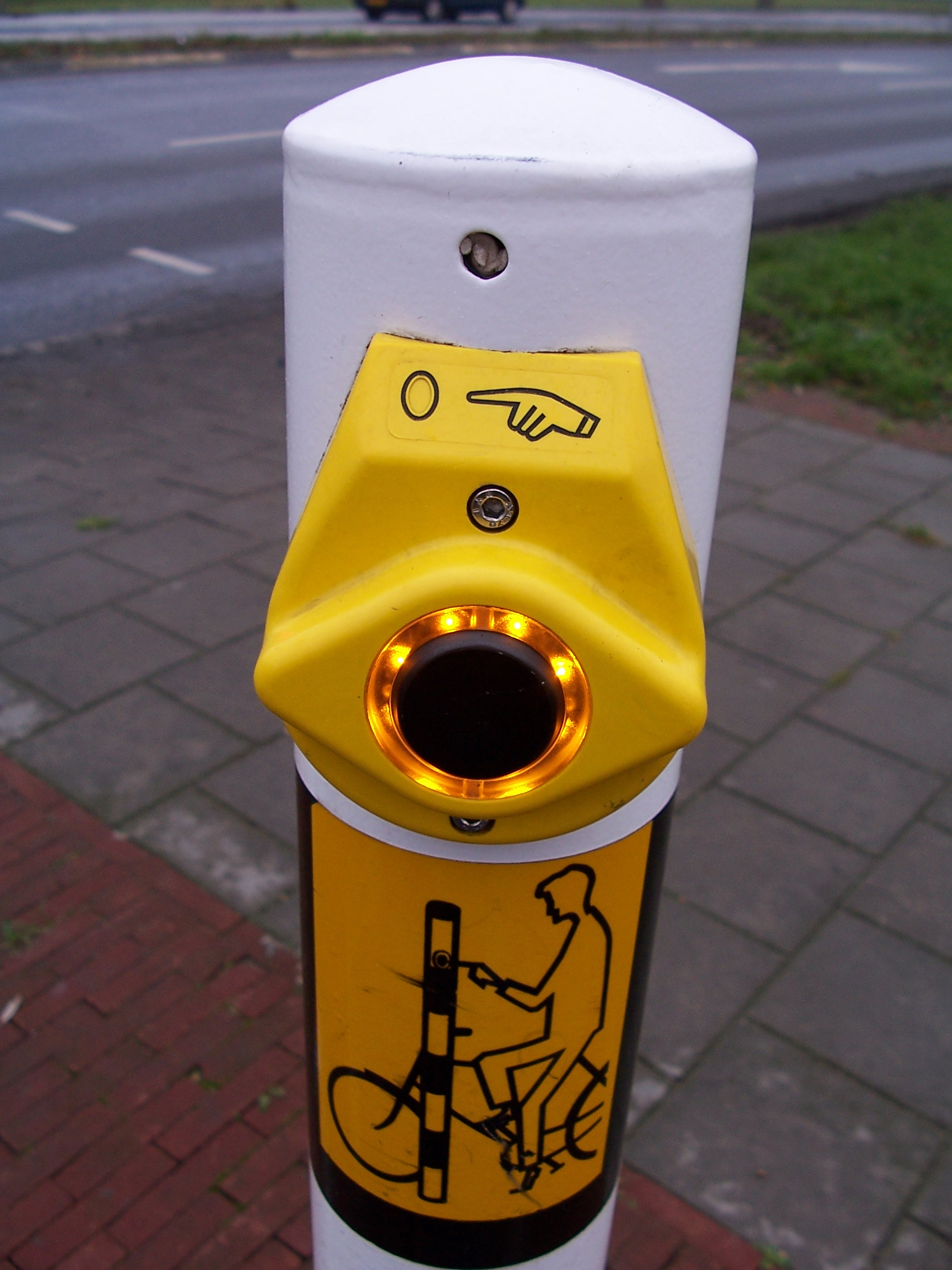
This vandal- and weather-resistant switch is used to request a traffic stop signal

Vandal-resistant switches (also referred to as vandal-proof switches) are electrical switches designed to be installed in a location (or device) and application where they may be subject to abuse and attempts to damage them, as in the case of pedestrian crossing switches. Vandal-resistant switches located on devices that are outdoors must be able to withstand extreme temperatures, dust, rain, snow, and ice. Many vandal-resistant switches are intended to be operated by the general public, and must withstand heavy use and even abuse, such as attempts to damage the switch with metal tools. These switches must also resist dirt and moisture.

Tamper-resistant switches (or tamper-proof switches) are types of vandal-resistant switches which are not intended to be operated except by authorized users. They may control special functions, such as auditing of voting machines, operation of power tools or equipment, enabling of security alarm systems (e.g., arming and disarming), or restocking of vending machines. A very commonly seen tamper-resistant switch is the ignition switch in most motor vehicles.

Vandal-resistant switches are usually protected by the use of robust materials, such as thick stainless steel or heavy-duty plastics. Some tamper-resistant switches are also protected against operation by using other approaches, such as hiding the switches behind a locked or screwed-down door-covered panel, or by requiring a key or passcode before the switch will operate the device. One widely used example of a tamper-proof switch is the ignition system of a standard car: to prevent strangers from joyriding in the car or stealing it, car ignition systems require a key to start the engine.

== Mechanical characteristics ==
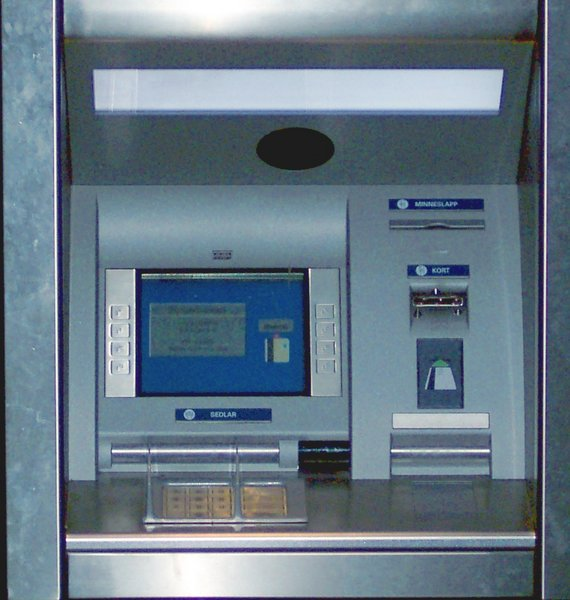
Automated Teller Machines (ATMs) use many vandal-resistant switches

Pushbutton vandal-resistant switches are frequently constructed of stainless steel or other durable materials, and are mounted into panels or housing boxes made out of strong materials, such as polycarbonate plastic, aluminium, or stainless steel. In some cases, the housing may be 1/4 inch (6.4 mm) thick, to protect both the switch and the housing from attempts by vandals to damage the switch or housing using blunt force. The housing for vandal-proof switches is often secured using security screws (which cannot be unscrewed with regular screwdrivers). The height of buttons in the panel is often minimized by using flush-mounting, to make it more difficult to pry them out, a design technique used in ATM banking machines that are located outside.

Vandal-resistant switches often need to be water and dust resistant due to their environments. Some types are potted to make them waterproof. The International Electrotechnical Commission has produced a standard, IEC 60529, which categorizes products' degrees of protection from liquids and dust using IP codes. A DIN extension of the IEC standard, DIN 40050-9 further defines Degree of Protection IP 69K as being able to withstand high-pressure washing or steam cleaning. This capability is needed in some particular applications, such as dairy milking machines, and is provided by some manufacturers' products.

== Electrical characteristics ==
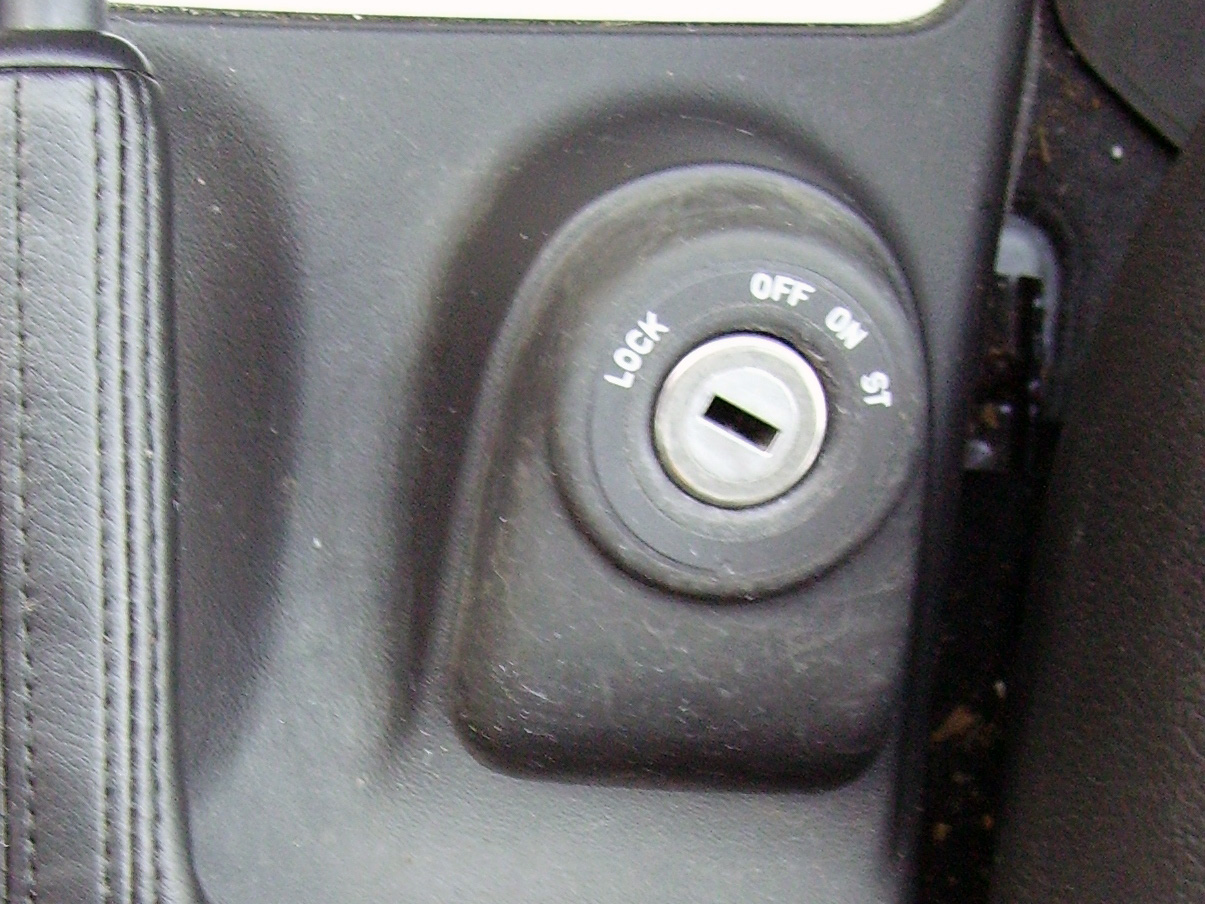
Tamper-resistant automotive ignition switches discourage car theft

Vandal-resistant switches are often low-voltage, low current, so-called "signal" types intended to trigger a change in state, perhaps from "off" to "on" and vice versa. The mechanical types often have gold-plated contacts that do not corrode, to allow reliable low-power switching. A few types are capable of switching 120 or 220 V AC power at several amperes, and are better suited to direct switching of the AC power to a device than the gold-plated contact switches. Heavy-duty switches often have silver or silver-plated contacts to handle higher currents.

Many but not all vandal-resistant switches are momentary types; that is to say they only open or close a circuit while being depressed and revert to their inactive state when the button is released. Piezoelectric vandal-resistant switches usually fall into this category, but generally provide a pulse signal rather than staying continuously activated during the time pressure is applied, unlike their mechanical contact-based counterparts. Latching (push-on/push-off)-type vandal-resistant switches with mechanical contacts are also available, and are often used as the power switch for equipment that is used very frequently or which may be subjected to abuse.

== Hidden switches ==
In some cases, such as equipment used in schools, community centers, or other public places, the equipment is designed so that some or all of the switches are hidden behind a locked cover. Some public address systems are sold in tamper-resistant designs that make it harder for unauthorized members of the public to activate the system or change the settings. The switches are at the rear of the unit; only LED lights are on the front of the panel. When the unit is rack-mounted into a wall or rack unit, this means that only official personnel (who are able to access the back of the panel) can change the settings or use the unit. Another variant on this design is to cover the switches with a locked panel. In some cases, such as the sound system in a bar or club, the locked cover may be made from transparent plexiglass, so that the sound engineer can verify the sound system settings and switches (yet at the same time, the locked panel prevents mischief-minded club patrons from tampering or altering the amplifier or equalizer settings).

In some cases, the switches are placed behind a door that is secured with a screw but not locked with a key; they are out of sight and thus less likely to be interfered with. Screw-on door-covered switches are used on public address equipment that is intended to be rented out to non-professional users. The switches for some settings, such as the on-off switch for the speaker-protection limiter or a low-pitch "rumble filter" (designed to protect speakers from very low sounds), may be hidden behind a screwed-on door or metal plate.

Screwed-on covers are also widely used on children's electric and electronic toys, so that a parent can control certain settings such as the maximum speed of a toy electric ride-on car or the maximum volume of a video game.

== Locked switches ==
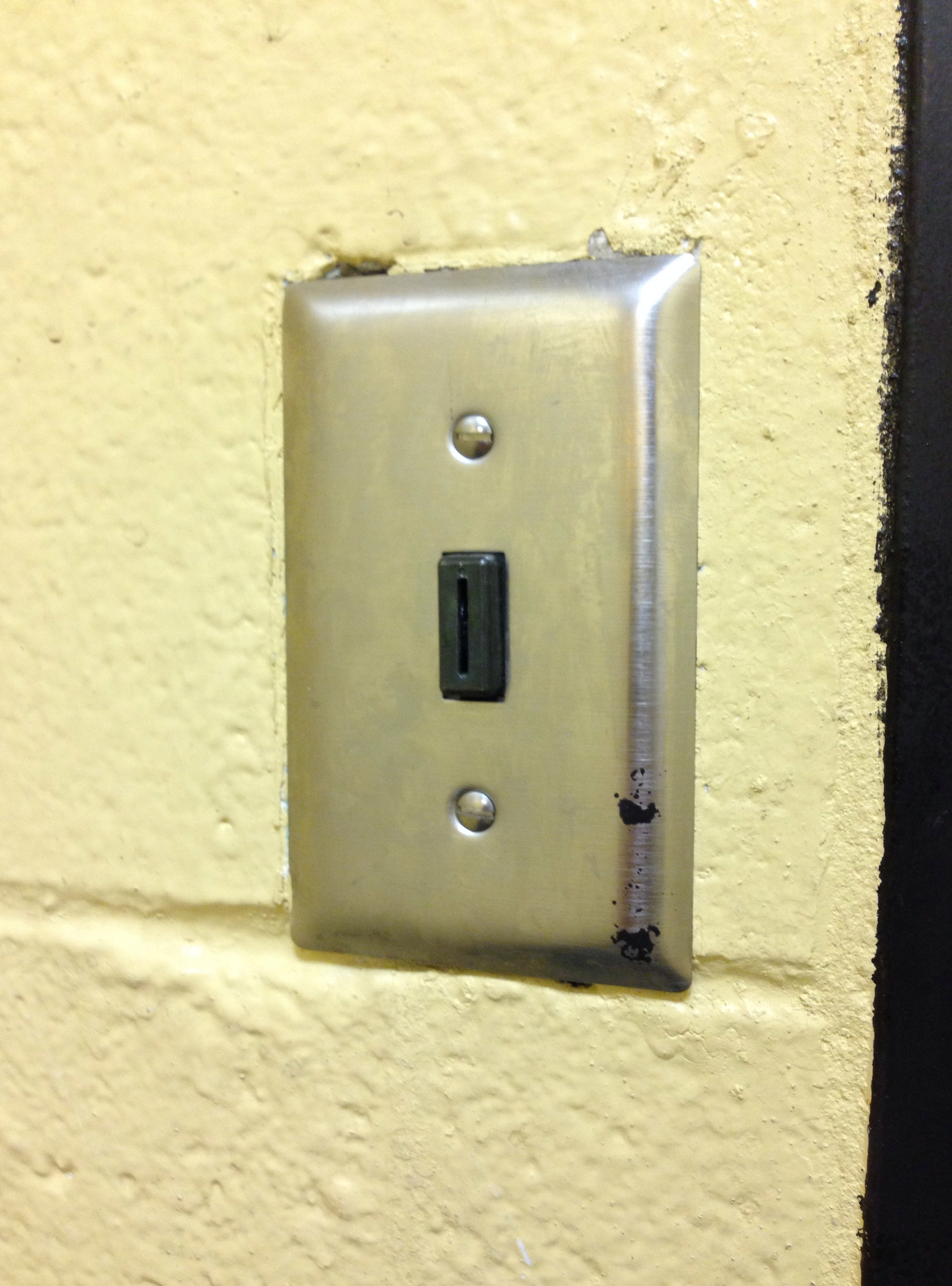
Tamper-resistant switch used for corridor and restroom lighting controls in public buildings

Where lighting circuits must not be accidentally switched off (for example, school corridors), a vandal-resistant switch may be installed. These require a simple key or tool to operate, and thus discourage casual or accidental operation of the switch.

In some devices, the switch is built into a keyed lock mechanism, which prevents unauthorized use of the device. In this type of vandal-proof system, when the key is turned in the lock, the user can turn the equipment on. Some mobility scooters for disabled people have a locked "on-off" switch, to prevent the scooter from being driven away by vandals or joyriders while it is parked in a public place. A variant of this design is to use a computerized keypad and a secret code that activates and deactivates the switches.

The circular saw systems in home improvement stores, such as Home Depot, use a combination code keypad to prevent store patrons from using the circular saw. The power tool cannot be operated until an authorized user (e.g. a trained store employee) enters a code into the keypad.

== Indicators ==
Vandal-resistant switches (like some other types of switches) can incorporate indicator lights or LEDs to indicate circuit activation, deactivation or fault conditions. LEDs are used for this purpose in this style switch, being available in several colors and operating at low voltages. Single and ring-shaped groups of LEDs can thus show the current status of equipment or machines. In some products the LEDs can have two colors to show multiple status conditions, such as On (green) / Off (extinguished) / Fault (red).

However, many switches indicate their status by purely mechanical means, such as by the position of a toggle handle, or the visibility of a brightly painted indicator flap.

== Non-mechanical types ==
Although mechanical contact-based switches are most commonly used for general purpose electrical switching, switches that have no moving parts are generally longer-lived. Piezo and capacitance switches are the two most popular non-mechanical switch types currently available. One advantage they have over mechanical contact-based switches is that they have no moving parts to wear out. This makes them capable of lasting for tens of millions of operations.

Glass reed switches use a thin metal "reed" that bends when a magnet is brought near it; since the entire unit is sealed in a glass tube, this helps protect the switch from moisture and dust that can damage regular switches.

== Applications ==
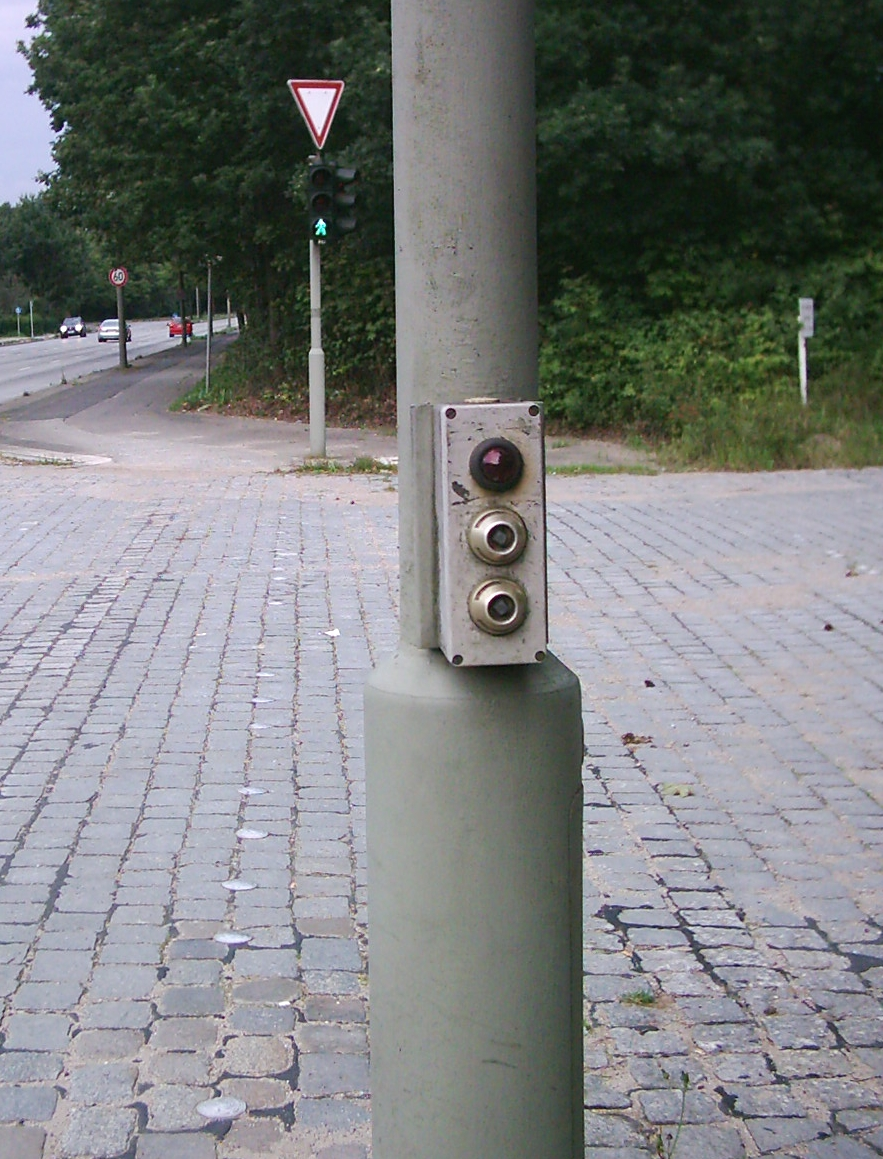
Traffic signal switches in a heavy-duty enclosure

- Public interactive kiosks that provide tourist information or government forms
- Elevator buttons and security switches
- Pedestrian crossing signal activation switches
- Intercom "push-to-talk" devices at the entrance to apartment buildings
- Electronic door switches for garages and mechanical gates
- Parking lot ticket machines and computerized ticket paying stations
- Alarm, safety, and security systems
- Automatic food and drink vending machines
- Public address systems in schools, community centers, and bars
- Rental equipment that may be subjected to heavy use

== See also ==
- Trapped-key interlocking
