= John Henry Holmes =

Inventor of technology behind the light switch

- Born: 1857
- Died: 1935 (aged 77–78)
- Education: Bootham School
- Alma mater: Durham University College of Physical Science
- Occupations: Electrical Engineer, Inventor
- Employer(s): J. H. Holmes & Co.
- Known for: Developing technology behind the modern light switch

John Henry Holmes (1857 – 1935) was an English electrical engineer, inventor, Quaker and pioneer of electric lighting who invented the quick break light switch, the technology behind which remains the basis for modern wall mounted light switches.

== Education ==
Holmes attended Bootham School in York followed, at age 16, by the Durham University College of Physical Science in Newcastle upon Tyne (now Newcastle University).

== Career ==
A 200 HP J.H. Holmes & Co Large "Castle" Dynamo

In 1880, Holmes attended a public demonstration of Joseph Swan's incandescent light bulb. This seemed to spark his interest in electric lighting, and he approached Swan on multiple occasions in hopes of becoming his apprentice.

John Henry Holmes and his brother Theodore, also a Quaker, founded J. H. Holmes & Co. in Shieldfield, Newcastle upon Tyne in 1883, their manufacturing company specializing in early motors, dynamos, switches, and lighting. The company was very active in the early proliferation of electric lighting, having installed Newcastle's first domestic electrical lighting into their father's house, and supplied installations throughout Europe and the British colonies, making deals in the United States as well.

John Henry Holmes invented the quick break light switch in 1884. which was patented in Great Britain and the United States that year. The technology radically improved the prior switch technology by ensuring the internal contacts moved apart quickly enough to deter the electric arcing that would create a fire hazard and otherwise invariably shorten the switch's lifespan. The quick break technology invented by Holmes remains in use in billions of domestic and industrial electrical switches across the globe to this day.
