= Body capacitance =

Storage of electricity in the human body

Body capacitance is the physical property of a human body to act as a capacitor. Like any other electrically conductive object, a human body can store electric charge if insulated. The actual amount of capacitance varies with the surroundings; it would be low when standing on top of a pole with nothing nearby, but high when leaning against an insulated, but grounded large metal surface, such as a household refrigerator, or a metal wall in a factory.

When a human's body capacitance is charged to a high voltage by friction or other means, it can produce undesirable effects when abruptly discharged as a spark. The influence of body capacitance on a tuned circuit may also change its resonant frequency, which would affect the performance of radio receivers. A capacitive sensing circuit that detects a change in body capacitance from a human finger can be used for a touchscreen or a touch switch, allowing control of devices without depressing mechanical switches.

== Properties ==
Friction with some fabrics can act as an electrostatic generator that can charge a human body to about 3 kV. Some electronic devices can be damaged by voltages of the order of 100 V. The breakdown voltages of metal oxide semiconductors without protection diodes may be even lower. Electronics factories are careful to prevent people from becoming charged. A branch of the electronics industry deals with preventing static charge build-up and protecting products against electrostatic discharge.

Notably, a combination of footwear with some sole materials, low humidity, and a dry carpet can cause footsteps to charge a person's body capacitance to as much as a few tens of kilovolts with respect to the earth. The human and surroundings then constitute a highly charged capacitor. A close approach to any conductive object connected to earth (ground) can create a shock, even a visible spark.

Capacitance of a human body in normal surroundings is typically in the tens to low hundreds of picofarads, which is small by typical electronic standards. The human-body model defined by the Electrostatic Discharge Association (ESDA) is a 100 pF capacitor in series with a 1.5 kΩ resistor. While humans are much larger than typical electronic components, they are also mostly separated by significant distance from other conductive objects. But close contact with another conducting body may cause an abrupt discharge of the stored energy as a spark. Although the occasional static shock can be startling and even unpleasant, the amount of stored energy is relatively low, and won't harm a healthy person. But it can result in momentary pain and a startle response that may cause further accidents. The spark may damage sensitive materials or electronic devices and in exceptional cases may ignite flammable gas or vapor resulting in a fire.

== Touch sensors ==
Body capacitance can be used to operate touch switches (e.g. for elevators or faucets). They respond to close approach of a part of a human body, usually a fingertip. They don't require applying any force to their surfaces. Rather, the capacitance between electrodes at the device's surface and the fingertip is sensed.

== Tuned circuits ==
Radio receivers rely on tuned circuits to isolate the frequency of a particular desired signal. Body capacitance was a significant nuisance when tuning the earliest radios; touching the tuning knob controlling the tuner's variable capacitor would couple the body capacitance into the tuning circuit, slightly changing its resonant frequency. Design of such circuits intended to be adjusted by a user must prevent interaction of the user's body capacitance with the resonant circuit, so that the resonant frequency is not affected. For example, a metal shield may be placed behind a tuning knob so that the presence of an operator's hand does not affect the tuning.

Body capacitance is exploited in the theremin to shift the frequency of the musical instrument's internal oscillators (one oscillator controls pitch and the other controls loudness).

== See also ==
- Self capacitance
- Triboelectric series
- Triboelectric effect
- Touch-sensitive lamp
- Test light: certain voltage tester probes rely on body capacitance
