= Piezo switch =

Type of electrical switch

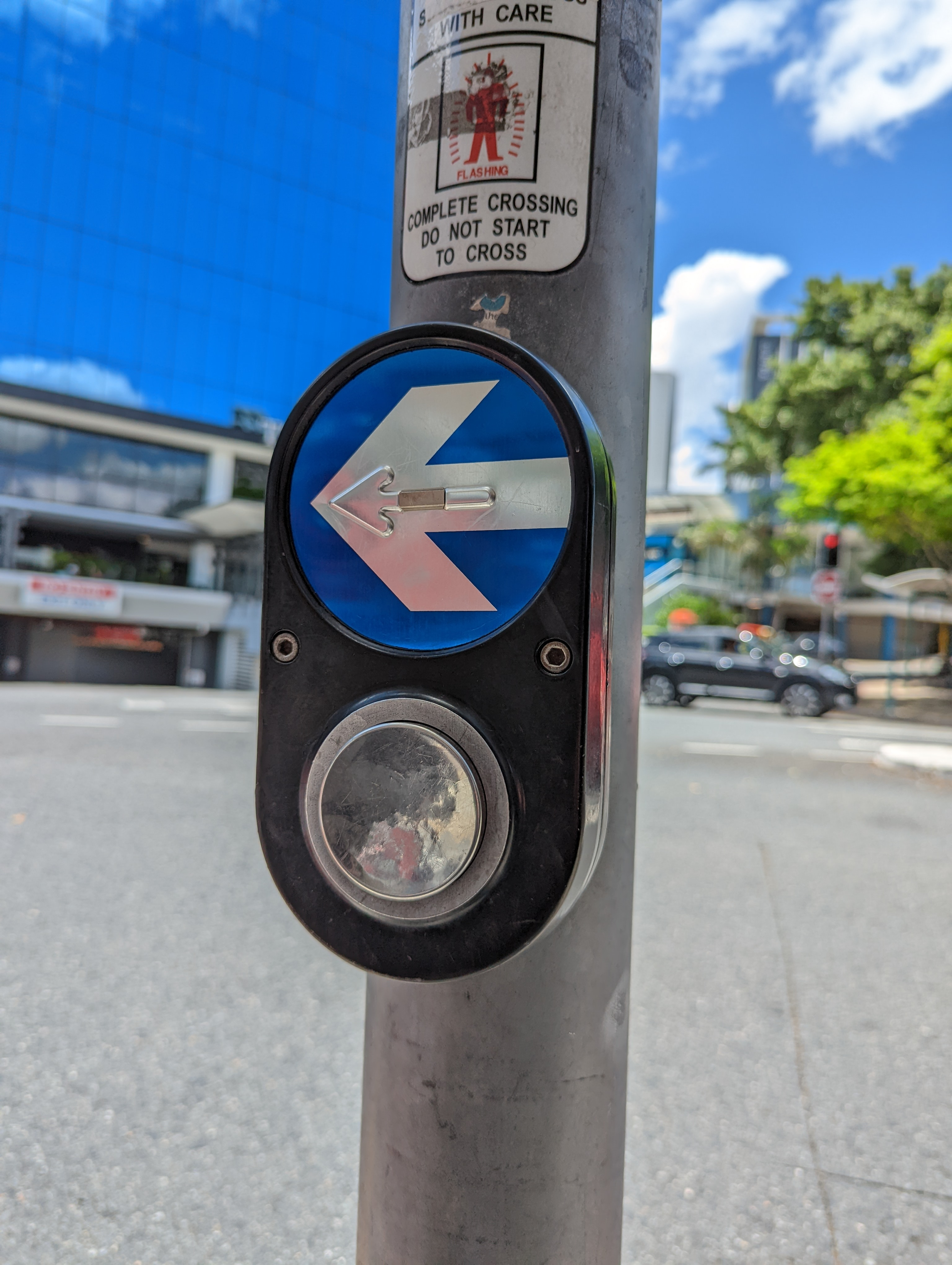
This ruggedized signal at a pedestrian crossing incorporates a piezo switch for durability, as well as a piezo speaker to produce audible sound.

A piezo switch (shortened from piezoelectric switch) is an electrical switch based on the piezoelectric effect. The robust construction of these switches helps make them resistant to heavy use, weathering, neglect, and vandalism.

== Operation ==
The piezoelectric effect is the generation of electric charge when certain materials are under stress. In the case of piezo switches, the force could be compressive pressure that causes the (typically disc-shaped) piezo element to bend very slightly like a drumhead.

The charge generated by the piezoelectric element in the switch is typically used to turn on an integrated semiconductor device such as a field effect transistor (FET), causing the switch assembly's output to be active, or "on" state. When the FET is on, current can flow through it as with a conventional metal contact-based switch or relay. After the voltage pulse is dissipated in the gate resistor, the FET turns back "off", returning to its normal high-impedance state.

Thus, piezo switches produce a single, brief "on" pulse. This pulse can vary with the amount of pressure that is applied, since higher pressures generate higher voltages which take longer to dissipate. A capacitor may be used to store the charge to lengthen the time constant of the gate circuit and therefore the width of the pulse. With additional circuitry, this pulse can be extended further or used to change the state of an output from steady "off" to steady "on" by toggling a flip-flop.

== Application ==
Piezo switches have some useful advantages over their conventional mechanical counterparts. One is that there are no (significantly) moving parts, just the small deformation on the front plate and the piezo element (typically a few micrometers). This means the lifetime of such a switch can be expected to be tens of millions of operations, since there is no friction wear involved. Another advantage is that they may easily be completely sealed from the environment and thus made weatherproof. They are often constructed with stainless steel housings such that they are resistant to damage by vandals or heavy use.

== See also ==
- Piezoresistive
- Piezo ignition
- Piezoelectric sensor
- Piezoelectric speaker
- Touch switch types: capacitance, resistance, and piezo
