= Touch-sensitive lamp =

Lamp with integrated touch switch

Video demonstrating the operation of a touch-sensitive lamp

A touch-sensitive lamp is a combination of a lamp and a touch switch. They act on the principle of body capacitance, activated by human touch rather than a flip, push-button, or other mechanical switch. They are popular as desk and nightstand lamps. Touch-sensitive lamp switches may be dimmable, allowing the brightness of the lamp to be adjusted by multiple touches. Most stop at level 3, which is for the brightest use. These lamps contain an oscillator that changes frequency when the metallic plate is touched.

== History ==
Aladdin Industries filed key "Aladdin Lamps" patents in 1954 and 1956, and commercial models were available by 1955. However, due to low electrical efficiency and high price of the vacuum tube-based product, the concept was not popularized until later versions of the touch mechanism used integrated circuits and transistors to improve efficiency and reduce cost in the mid 1980s.
