= Piezoelectric speaker =

Type of loudspeaker

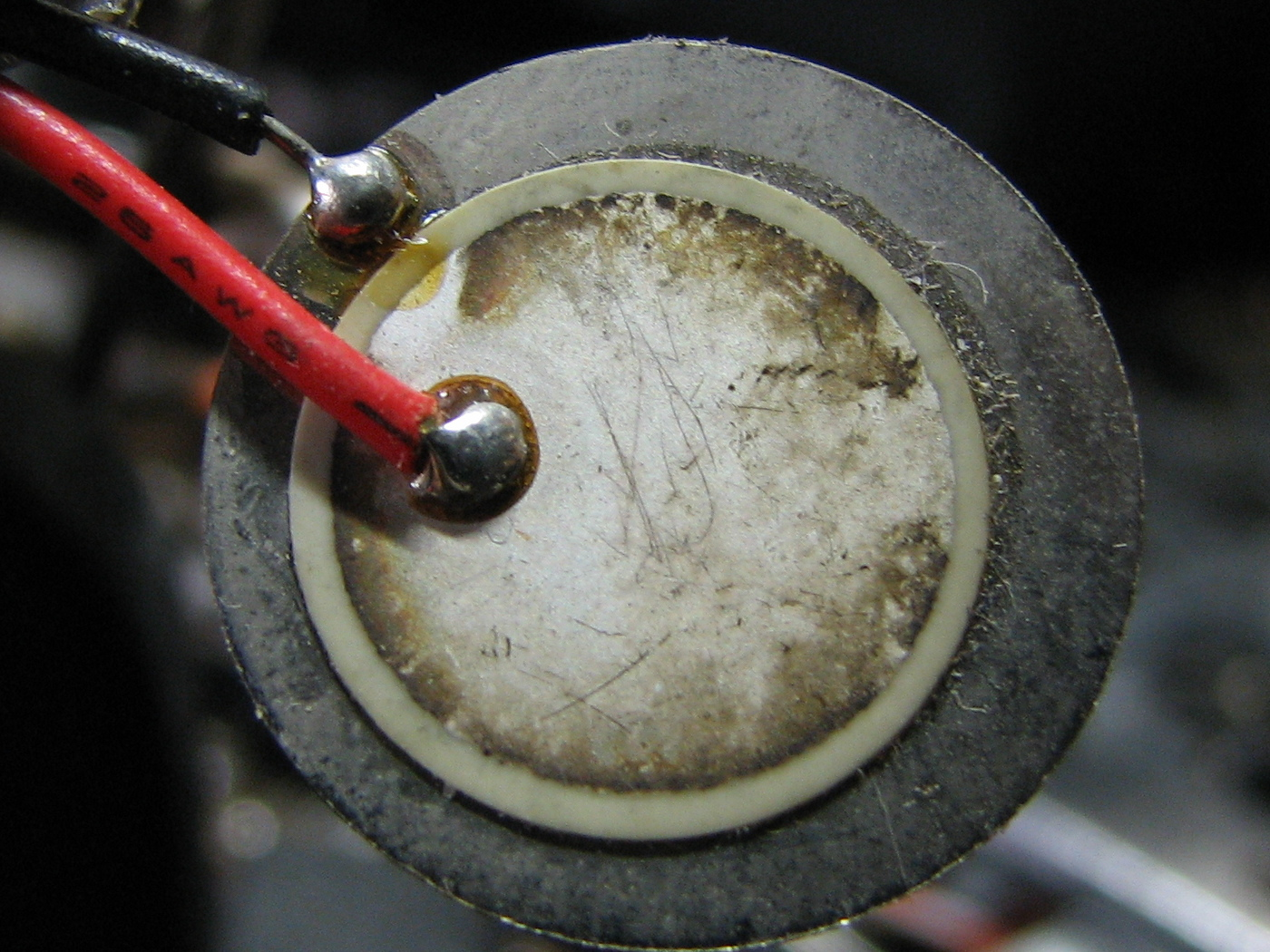
This piezoelectric buzzer uses a white ceramic piezoelectric material sandwiched between two metal diaphragms.

When fixed to a metallic diaphragm and excited with an alternating voltage, the diameter of the disc varies by a small amount, which causes dishing of the diaphragm and produces a much louder sound.

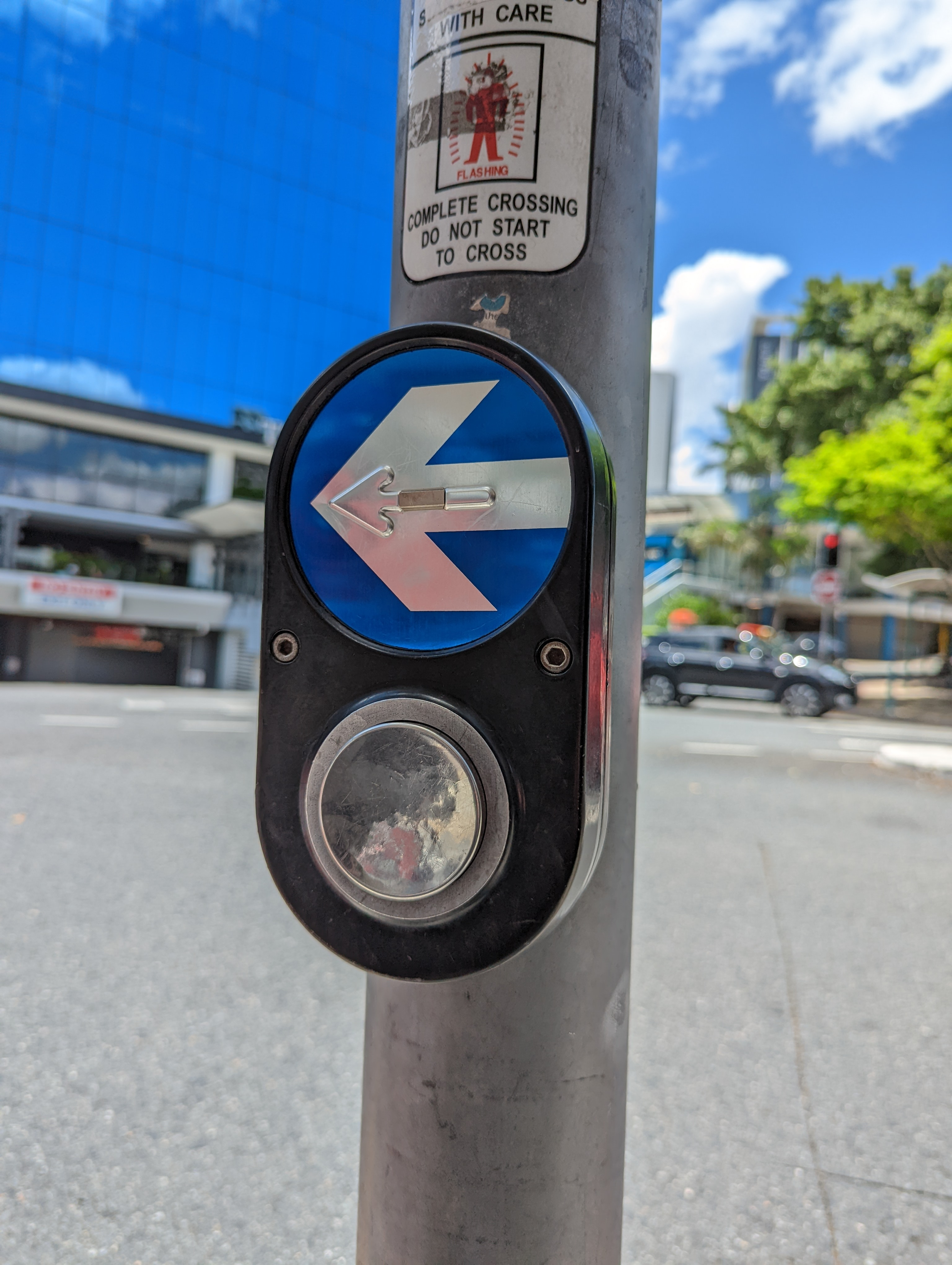
This ruggedized signal at a pedestrian crossing incorporates a piezo speaker to produce audible sound, as well as a piezo switch for durability.

A piezoelectric speaker (also known as a piezo bender due to its mode of operation, and sometimes colloquially called a "piezo", buzzer, crystal loudspeaker, or beep speaker) is a loudspeaker that uses the piezoelectric effect for generating sound. The initial mechanical motion is created by applying a voltage to a piezoelectric material, and this motion is typically converted into audible sound using diaphragms and resonators. The prefix piezo- is Greek for 'press' or 'squeeze'.

== Usage ==
Piezoelectric speakers are frequently used to generate sound in digital quartz watches and other electronic devices, and are sometimes used as tweeters in less-expensive speaker systems, such as computer speakers and portable radios. They are also used for producing ultrasound in sonar systems.

Compared to other speaker designs, piezoelectric speakers are relatively easy to drive; for example they can be connected directly to TTL outputs, although more complex drivers can produce greater sound intensity. Typically, they operate well in the range of 1–5 kHz and up to 100 kHz in ultrasound applications.

Piezoelectric speakers have several advantages over conventional loudspeakers: they are resistant to overloads that would normally destroy most high frequency drivers, and they can be used without a crossover due to their electrical properties. Piezo speakers can also be robustly constructed, and made to withstand heavy usage, neglect, weathering, and vandalism.

There are also disadvantages: some amplifiers can oscillate when driving capacitive loads like most piezoelectrics, which results in distortion or damage to the amplifier. Additionally, piezo speaker frequency response in most cases is inferior to that of other technologies, especially with regards to bass and midrange. This is why they are usually used in applications where volume and high pitch are more important than sound quality.

Piezoelectric speakers can have extended high frequency output, and this is useful in some specialized circumstances; for instance, sonar applications in which piezoelectric variants are used as both output devices (generating underwater sound) and as input devices (acting as the sensing components of underwater microphones). They have advantages in these applications, not the least of which is simple and solid state construction that resists seawater better than a ribbon or voice coil based device.

== See also ==
- Buzzer
- Piezo switch
