= Touch switch =

Electrical switch which is activated by being touched

A touch switch is a type of switch that only has to be touched by an object to operate. It is used in many lamps and wall switches that have a metal exterior as well as on public computer terminals. A touchscreen includes an array of touch switches on a display. A touch switch is the simplest kind of tactile sensor.

== Types ==
There are three types of switches called touch switches:

=== Capacitance switch ===
A self-capacitance switch needs only one electrode to function. The electrode can be placed behind a non-conductive panel such as wood, glass, or plastic. The switch works using body capacitance, a property of the human body that gives it great electrical characteristics. The switch keeps charging and discharging its metal exterior to detect changes in capacitance. When a person touches it, their body increases the capacitance and triggers the switch.

Unlike self-capacitance, mutual capacitive touch is based on capacitance changes between two electrodes. This system employs two sets of electrodes—transmitting electrodes (Tx) and receiving electrodes (Rx). When a user’s finger or another object approaches these electrodes, it disrupts the electric field between them, resulting in a change in capacitance value. Mutual capacitance is also known as projected capacitance. The advantages of mutual capacitance technology include tight electric field coupling, allowing for more flexible design. For example, keyboards can have closely grouped keys without worrying about cross-coupling. However, mutual capacitance also has its limitations, such as its measurement noise being generally greater than self-capacitance.

Capacitance switches are available commercially as integrated circuits from a number of manufacturers. These devices can also be used as a short-range proximity sensor.

=== Resistance touch switch ===
A resistance switch needs two electrodes to be physically in contact with something electrically conductive (for example a finger) to operate. They work by lowering the resistance between two pieces of metal. It is thus much simpler in construction compared to the capacitance switch. Placing one or two fingers across the plates achieves a turn on or closed state. Removing the finger(s) from the metal pieces turns the device off.

One implementation of a resistance touch switch would be two Darlington-paired transistors where the base of the first transistor is connected to one of the electrodes.

Also, an N-channel, enhancement-mode, metal oxide field effect transistor can be used. Its gate can be connected to one of the electrodes and the other electrode through a resistance to a positive voltage.

=== Piezo touch switch ===
Piezo touch switches are based on mechanical bending of piezo ceramic, typically constructed directly behind a surface. This solution enables touch interfaces with any kind of material. Another characteristic of piezo is that it can function as actuator as well. Current commercial solutions construct the piezo in such a way that touching it with approximately 1.5 N is enough, even for stiff materials like stainless steel.

Piezo touch switches are available commercially.

== Comparison ==
Piezo switches respond to a mechanical force applied to the switch. The switch will operate regardless of whether force is applied through insulating or conducting materials. Capacitive switches respond to an electric field applied to the switch. The field will pass through thin gloves, but not through thick gloves.

Piezo switches usually cost more than capacitive switches.

== Lamps ==
Video demonstrating the operation of a touch-sensitive lamp

A touch-sensitive lamp is a combination of a lamp and a touch switch. They act on the principle of body capacitance, activated by human touch rather than a flip, push-button, or other mechanical switch. They are popular as desk and nightstand lamps. Touch-sensitive lamp switches may be dimmable, allowing the brightness of the lamp to be adjusted by multiple touches. Most stop at level 3, which is for the brightest use. These lamps contain an oscillator that changes frequency when the metallic plate is touched.
