= Gutianshan National Nature Reserve =

Natural reserve in Zhejiang, China

- IUCN category V (protected landscape/seascape)
- Location within China
- Location: Zhejiang, China
- Nearest city: Quzhou
- Coordinates: 29.167°N 118.233°E.
- Area: 81.07 km^{2} (31.30 sq mi)
- Established: 1975

Gutianshan National Nature Reserve (Chinese: 古田山; pinyin: gutiánshān; lit. 'Old farm mountain(s)') is a nature reserve in Kaihua County, in the western part of Zhejiang Province, on the border of Jiangxi province. The reserve was established as a smaller, provincial-level nature reserve in 1975, and upgraded to its present size and status in 2001. The reserve occupies a mountainous, forested area, and is part of the Nanling mountains. The highest peak is Shiershan (Chinese: 石耳山; pinyin: shíěrshān; lit. 'Stone ear mountain') at 1,258 metres (4,127 ft).

== Flora and fauna ==
The reserve was established to preserve old-growth evergreen broad-leaved forest in the region. About 57% of the reserve is natural forest. Altogether 1426 species of seed plants have been reported in the reserve. The dominant plants species are Castanopsis eyrei, Schima superba (Chinese: 木荷), and Pinus massoniana.

Notable birds of the reserve include Elliot's pheasant. Mammals include clouded leopard, Asian black bear, Sumatran serow, and sika deer. The reserve hosts a population of hairy-fronted muntjacs estimated at 300–400 individuals.

== Research activity ==
The reserve hosts a 24-ha forest plot that belongs to the Chinese Forest Biodiversity Monitoring Network (CForBio). The plot was established in 2005 when all trees with the diameter at breast height (dbh) ≥1 cm were tagged, identified, measured, and georeferenced. Altogether 140,676 individual trees from 49 families and 159 species were identified in the plot. The plot belongs also to the global network of forest research plots in the Center for Tropical Forest Science consortium. Several scientific publications have resulted from studies conducted on the plot.

In 2009 the Research Station of Forestry Biodiversity and Climatic Change belonging to the Institute of Botany (Chinese Academy of Sciences) was opened. The station was co-sponsored by HSBC, the Earthwatch Institute and the Institute of Botany.
