= Mapeng Catholic Church =

- 麻蓬天主教堂
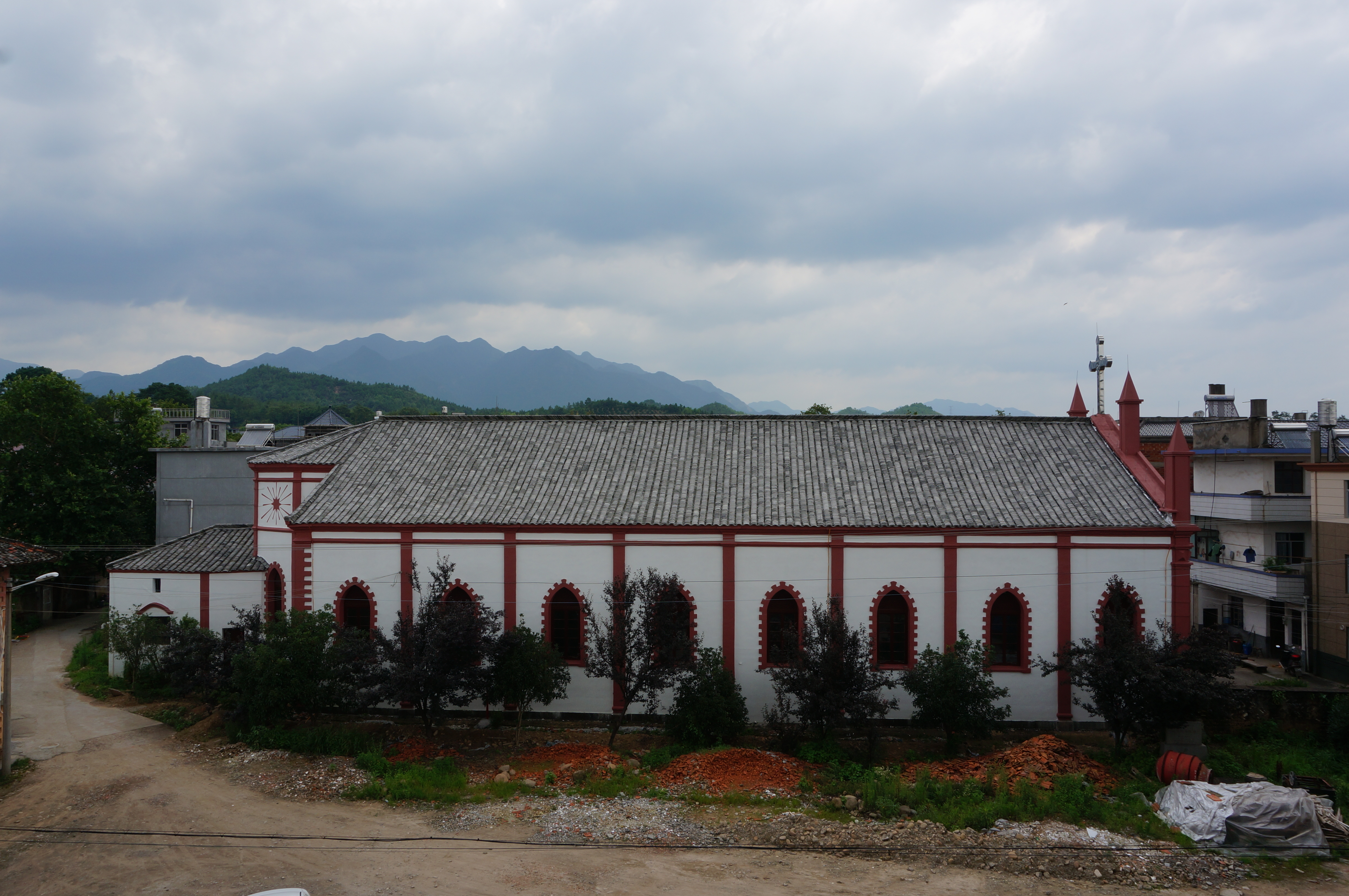
- Mapeng Catholic Church in 2015

- Location in Zhejiang
- 28°57′51″N 118°53′04″E
- Location: Kecheng District, Quzhou, Zhejiang, China
- Denomination: Protestantism

History
- Status: Church
- Founded: 1830

Architecture
- Functional status: Active
- Architectural type: Church building
- Completed: 1912 (reconstruction)

Specifications
- Materials: Granite, bricks

Mapeng Catholic Church (Chinese: 麻蓬天主教堂; pinyin: Mápéng Tiānzhǔ Jiàotáng) is a Roman Catholic church located in Kecheng District of Quzhou, Zhejiang, China.

== History ==
The church was originally built in 1830, during the ruling of Daoguang Emperor (1821–1850) of the Qing dynasty (1644–1911). It was rebuilt in 1912. The whole villagers are Catholics. In January 2011, it was inscribed as a provincial cultural relic preservation organ by the Zhejiang government.

== Architecture ==
The church complex is located in the west and faces the east with brief layout, it includes the church, priest's house, nun's house, Peixin Primary School (培信小学), nursery and missionary cemetery.
