= Suzhuang =

Suzhuang may refer to the following places in China:

- Suzhuang Station, Beijing
- Suzhuang Township, Qinshui County, Shanxi Province
- Suzhuang, Zhejiang, a town in Kaihua Country, Zhejiang Province
