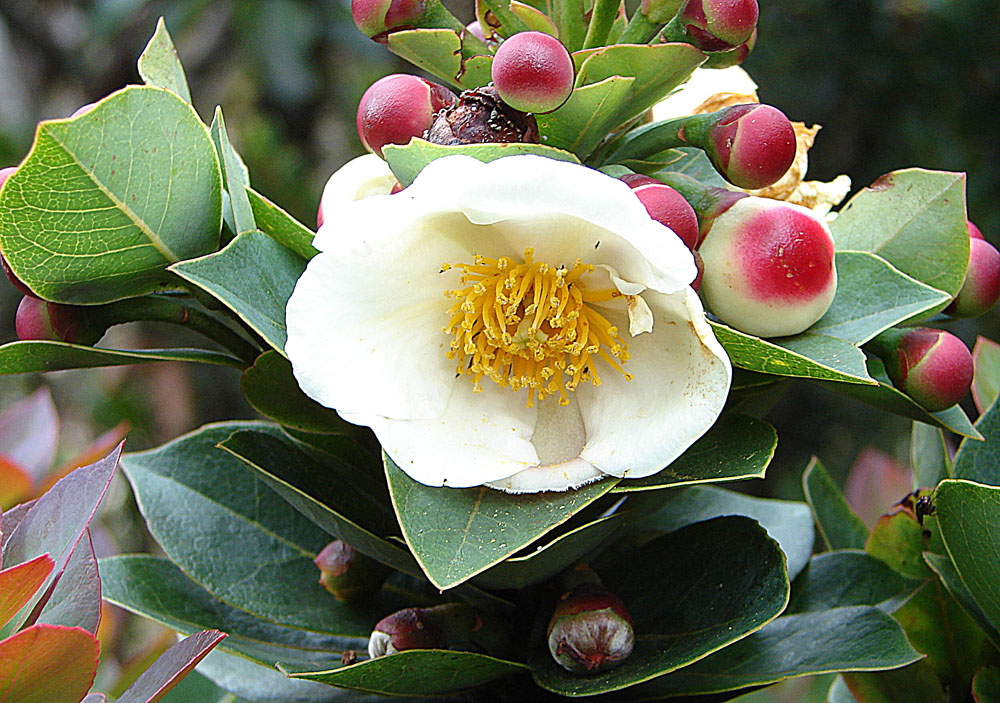
- Flower and flower buds
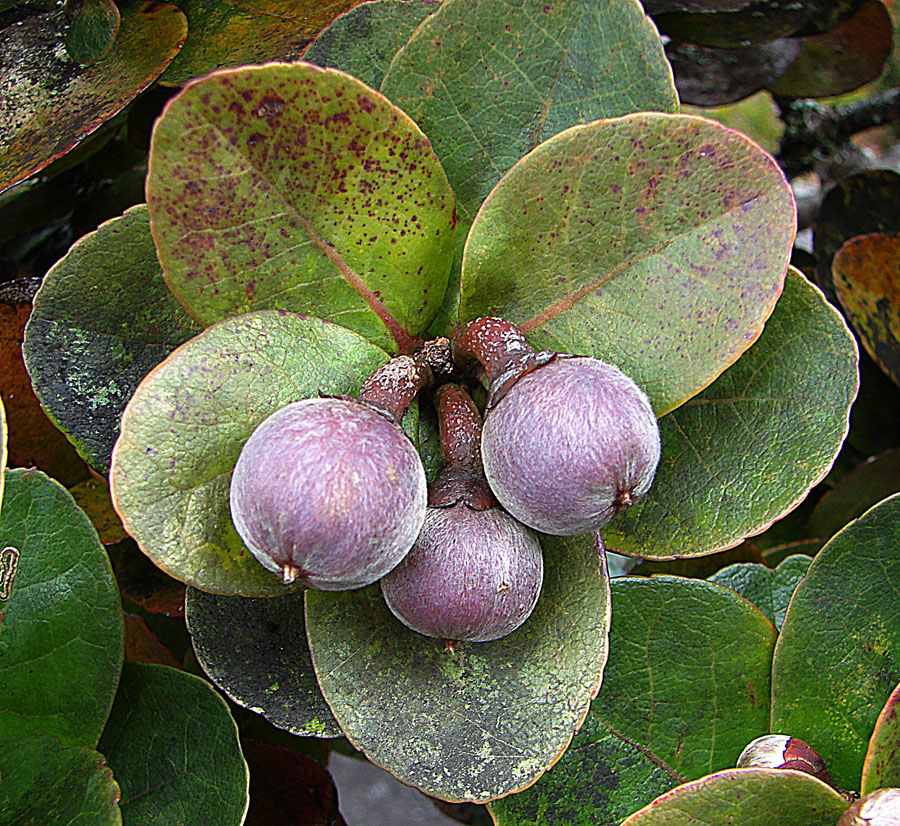
- Fruit

Conservation status
- Least Concern (IUCN 3.1)

Scientific classification
- Kingdom: Plantae
- Clade: Embryophytes
- Clade: Tracheophytes
- Clade: Angiosperms
- Clade: Eudicots
- Clade: Asterids
- Order: Ericales
- Family: Theaceae
- Genus: Schima
- Species: S. brevifolia

Binomial name
- Schima brevifolia (Hook.f.) Baill. ex Stapf

Synonyms
- Gordonia brevifolia Hook.f.

= Schima brevifolia =

Species of plant

Schima brevifolia is a species of flowering plant in the tea family Theaceae. It is native to Borneo. A shrub or small tree typically 2 m (7 ft) tall but reaching 5 m (16 ft), it is found in variety of montane habitats, including oak woodlands, mossy forests, and bare sandstone at elevations from 1,800 to 3,500 m (5,900 to 11,500 ft) on the slopes of Mount Kinabalu and the Kelabit Highlands.
