= Longyou County =

County in Zhejiang, China

Longyou 龙游县 Lungyu
- County
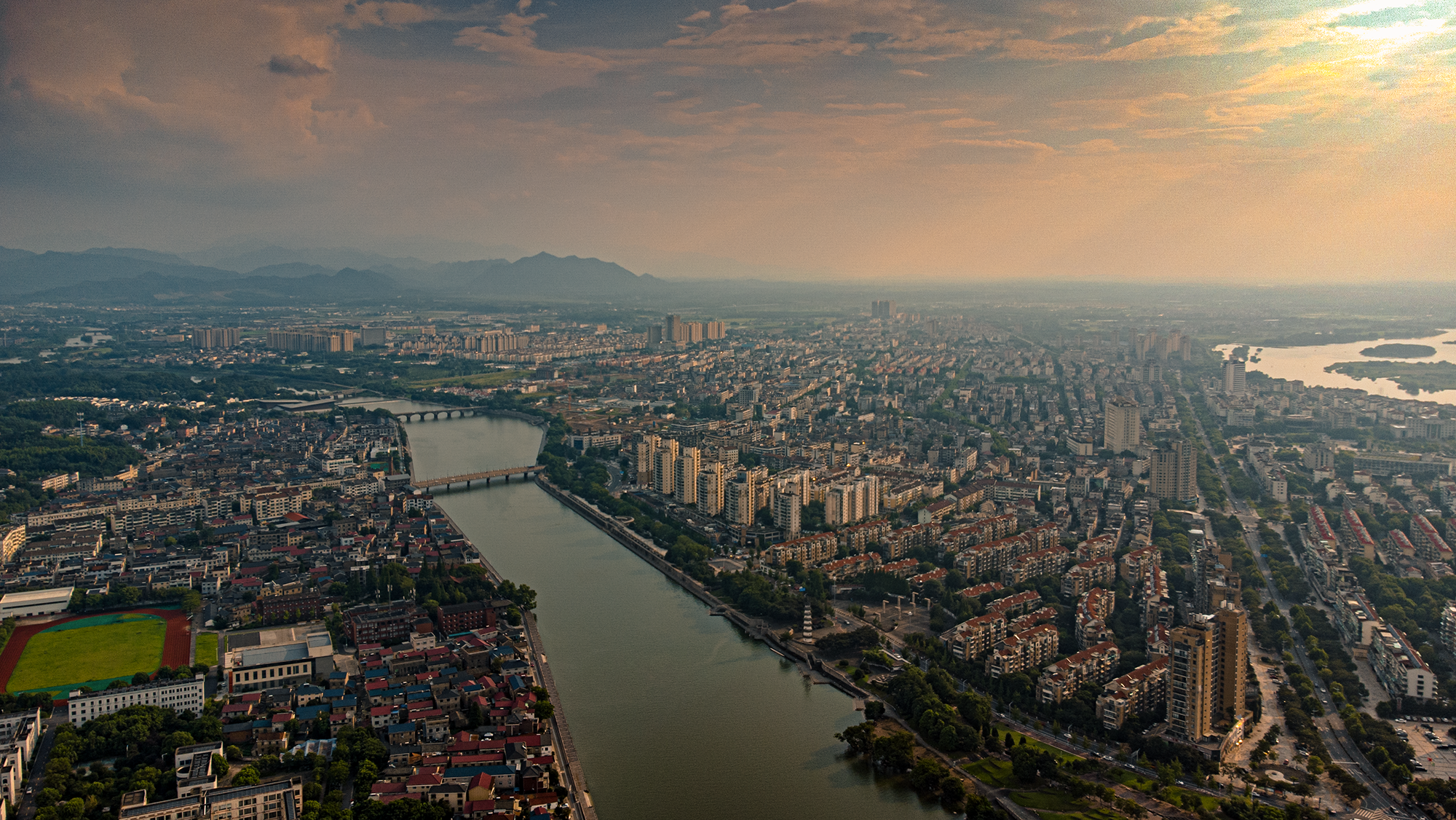

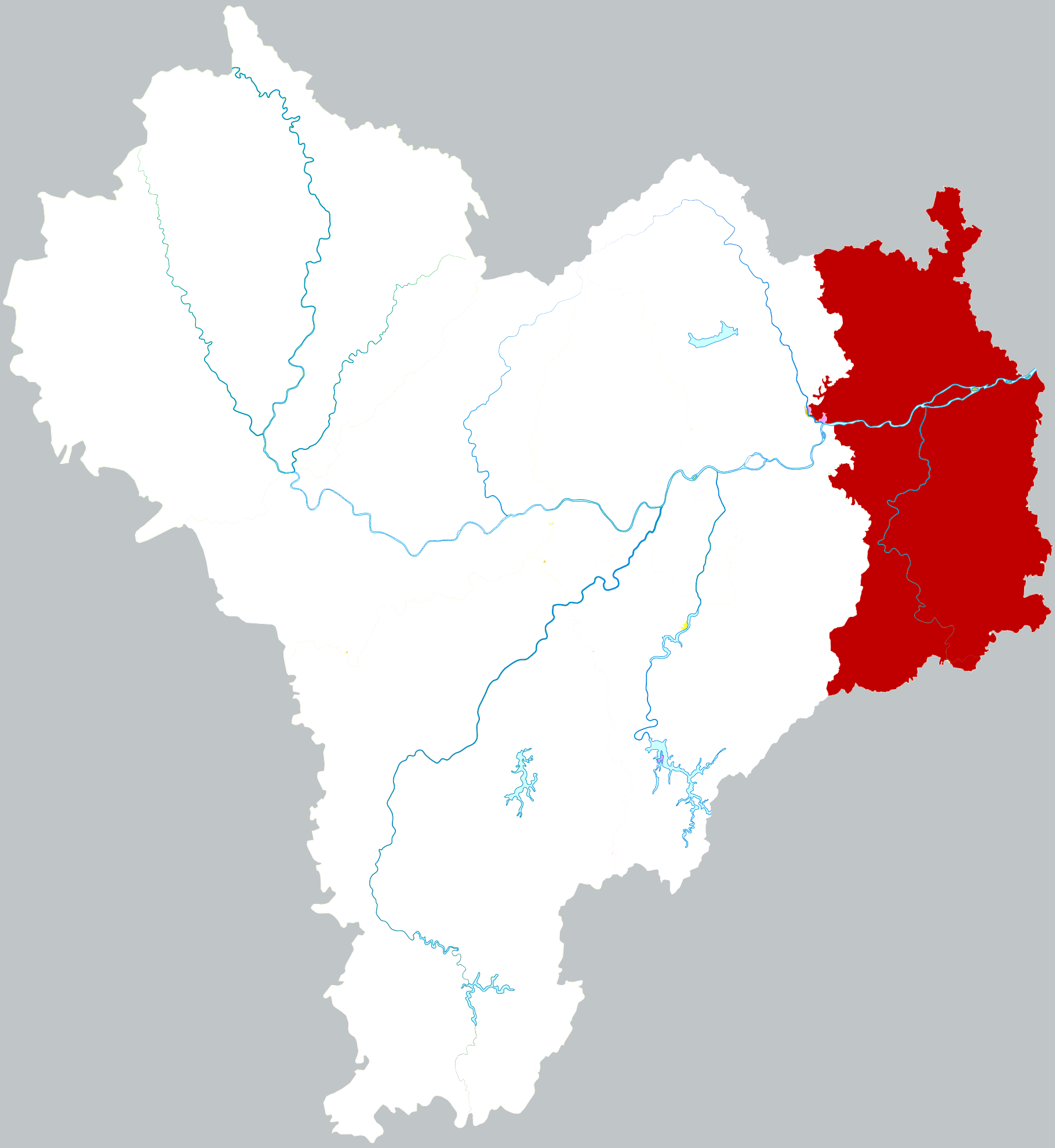
- Location of Longyou County within Quzhou

- Location of the seat in Zhejiang
- Coordinates: 29°02′07″N 119°10′58″E
- Country: People's Republic of China
- Province: Zhejiang
- Prefecture-level city: Quzhou

Area
  - Total: 1,143 km^{2} (441 sq mi)

Population (2010)
  - Total: 403,100
  - Density: 352.7/km^{2} (913.4/sq mi)
- Time zone: UTC+8 (China Standard)

Longyou
- Simplified Chinese: 龙游
- Traditional Chinese: 龍游
- Postal: Lungyu
Transcriptions
Standard Mandarin
- Hanyu Pinyin: Lóngyóu
- Wade–Giles: Lung^{2}-yu^{2}

Longyou County is a county of Quzhou City, in the west of Zhejiang Province, China.

The Huzhen pagoda (湖镇舍利塔; Húzhèn Shèlìtǎ) is located in this county. The Quzhou Longyou Caves or Grottoes (衢州龙游石窟; Qúzhōu Lóngyóu shíkū, 29.06200°N 119.18412°E). are a local feature.

== Administrative divisions ==
Subdistricts:

- Donghua Subdistrict (东华街道), Longzhou Subdistrict (龙洲街道)

Towns:

- Huzhen (湖镇镇), Xikou (溪口镇), Hengshan (横山镇), Tashi (塔石镇), Zhanjia (詹家镇), Xiaonanhai (小南海镇)

Townships:

- Miaoxia Township (庙下乡), Shifo Township (石佛乡), Mohuan Township (模环乡), Luojia Township (罗家乡), Sheyang Township (社阳乡), Dajie Township (大街乡), Shujian She Ethnic Township (沐尘畲族乡)

== Climate ==
Climate data for Longyou, elevation 66 m (217 ft), (1991–2020 normals, extremes 1981–present)
Month	Jan	Feb	Mar	Apr	May	Jun	Jul	Aug	Sep	Oct	Nov	Dec	Year
Record high °C (°F)	23.8 (74.8)	28.9 (84.0)	33.5 (92.3)	34.3 (93.7)	36.6 (97.9)	38.1 (100.6)	41.4 (106.5)	41.1 (106.0)	40.4 (104.7)	35.9 (96.6)	32.0 (89.6)	24.0 (75.2)	41.4 (106.5)
Mean daily maximum °C (°F)	9.7 (49.5)	12.4 (54.3)	16.6 (61.9)	22.8 (73.0)	27.5 (81.5)	29.6 (85.3)	34.4 (93.9)	33.8 (92.8)	29.5 (85.1)	24.3 (75.7)	18.5 (65.3)	12.3 (54.1)	22.6 (72.7)
Daily mean °C (°F)	5.7 (42.3)	7.9 (46.2)	11.8 (53.2)	17.6 (63.7)	22.4 (72.3)	25.3 (77.5)	29.2 (84.6)	28.6 (83.5)	24.6 (76.3)	19.3 (66.7)	13.6 (56.5)	7.7 (45.9)	17.8 (64.1)
Mean daily minimum °C (°F)	2.7 (36.9)	4.5 (40.1)	8.1 (46.6)	13.5 (56.3)	18.4 (65.1)	21.9 (71.4)	25.0 (77.0)	24.7 (76.5)	20.9 (69.6)	15.3 (59.5)	9.9 (49.8)	4.2 (39.6)	14.1 (57.4)
Record low °C (°F)	−6.6 (20.1)	−6.3 (20.7)	−2.1 (28.2)	1.4 (34.5)	8.5 (47.3)	12.5 (54.5)	18.8 (65.8)	18.5 (65.3)	11.9 (53.4)	3.3 (37.9)	−1.9 (28.6)	−8.1 (17.4)	−8.1 (17.4)
Average precipitation mm (inches)	96.7 (3.81)	108.9 (4.29)	190.1 (7.48)	195.2 (7.69)	197.2 (7.76)	324.2 (12.76)	156.7 (6.17)	129.0 (5.08)	89.8 (3.54)	59.9 (2.36)	86.4 (3.40)	76.1 (3.00)	1,710.2 (67.34)
Average precipitation days (≥ 0.1 mm)	14.1	13.4	17.8	16.5	15.9	17.8	11.3	12.9	10.8	8.5	11.1	10.8	160.9
Average snowy days	3.3	2.4	0.6	0	0	0	0	0	0	0	0.1	1.3	7.7
Average relative humidity (%)	78	77	77	76	76	81	74	75	77	75	78	76	77
Mean monthly sunshine hours	97.3	97.2	110.6	136.2	155.6	131.8	239.8	223.9	174.8	165.1	130.3	127.3	1,789.9
Percentage possible sunshine	30	31	30	35	37	32	56	55	48	47	41	40	40
Source: China Meteorological Administration
