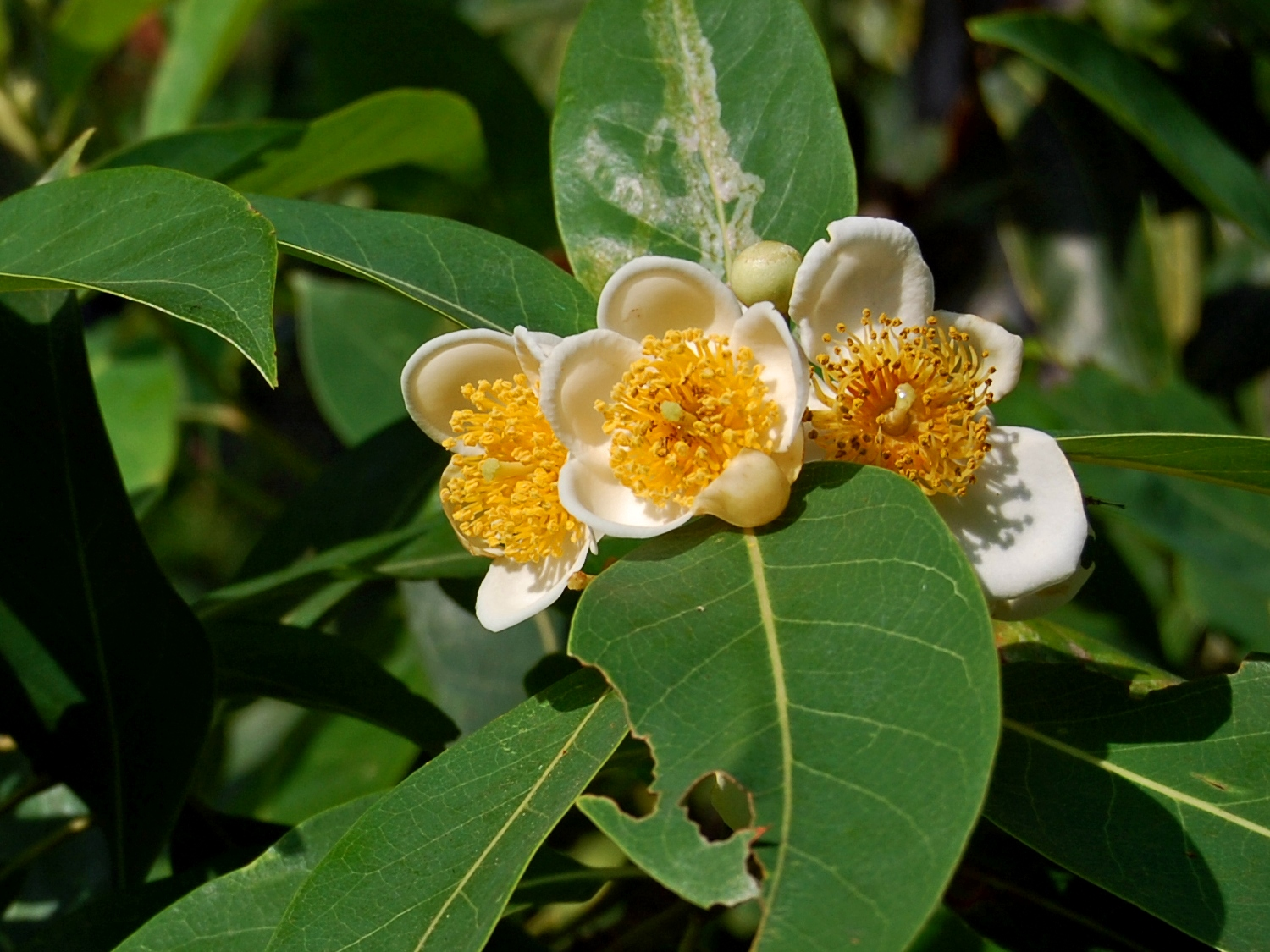

Conservation status
- Least Concern (IUCN 3.1)

Scientific classification
- Kingdom: Plantae
- Clade: Tracheophytes
- Clade: Angiosperms
- Clade: Eudicots
- Clade: Asterids
- Order: Ericales
- Family: Theaceae
- Genus: Schima
- Species: S. wallichii

Binomial name
- Schima wallichii (DC.) Korth.

Synonyms
- Gordonia chilaunia Buch.-Ham. ex D. Don; Gordonia wallichii DC.; Schima brevipes Craib

= Schima wallichii =

Species of tree

Schima wallichii, commonly known as the needlewood or Chinese guger tree, is a species of evergreen tree in the tea family, Theaceae.

Schima wallichii is native to a wide area of China and tropical Asia. It grows 10–20 metres (33–66 ft) tall.

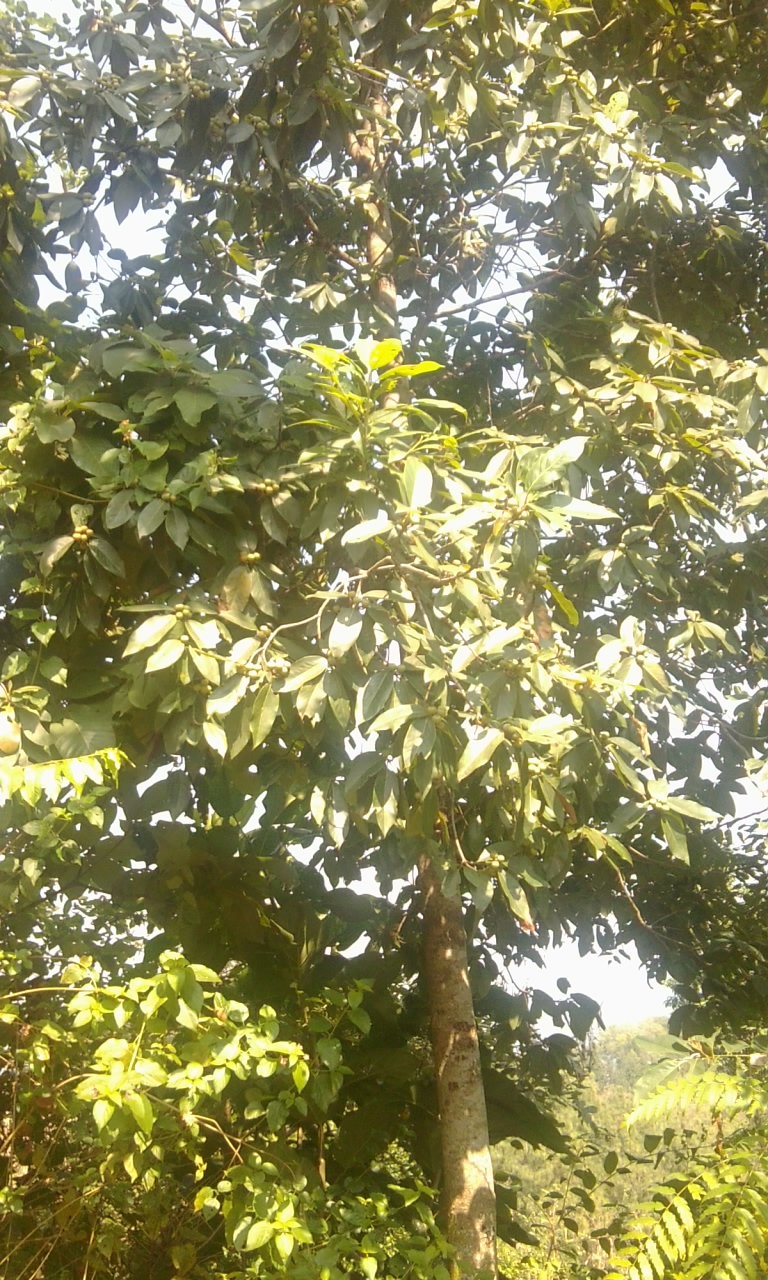
growth habit

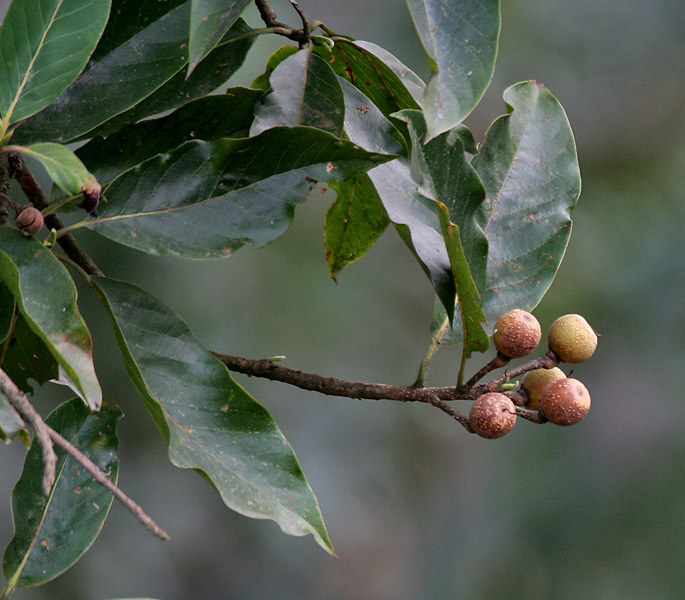
fruit

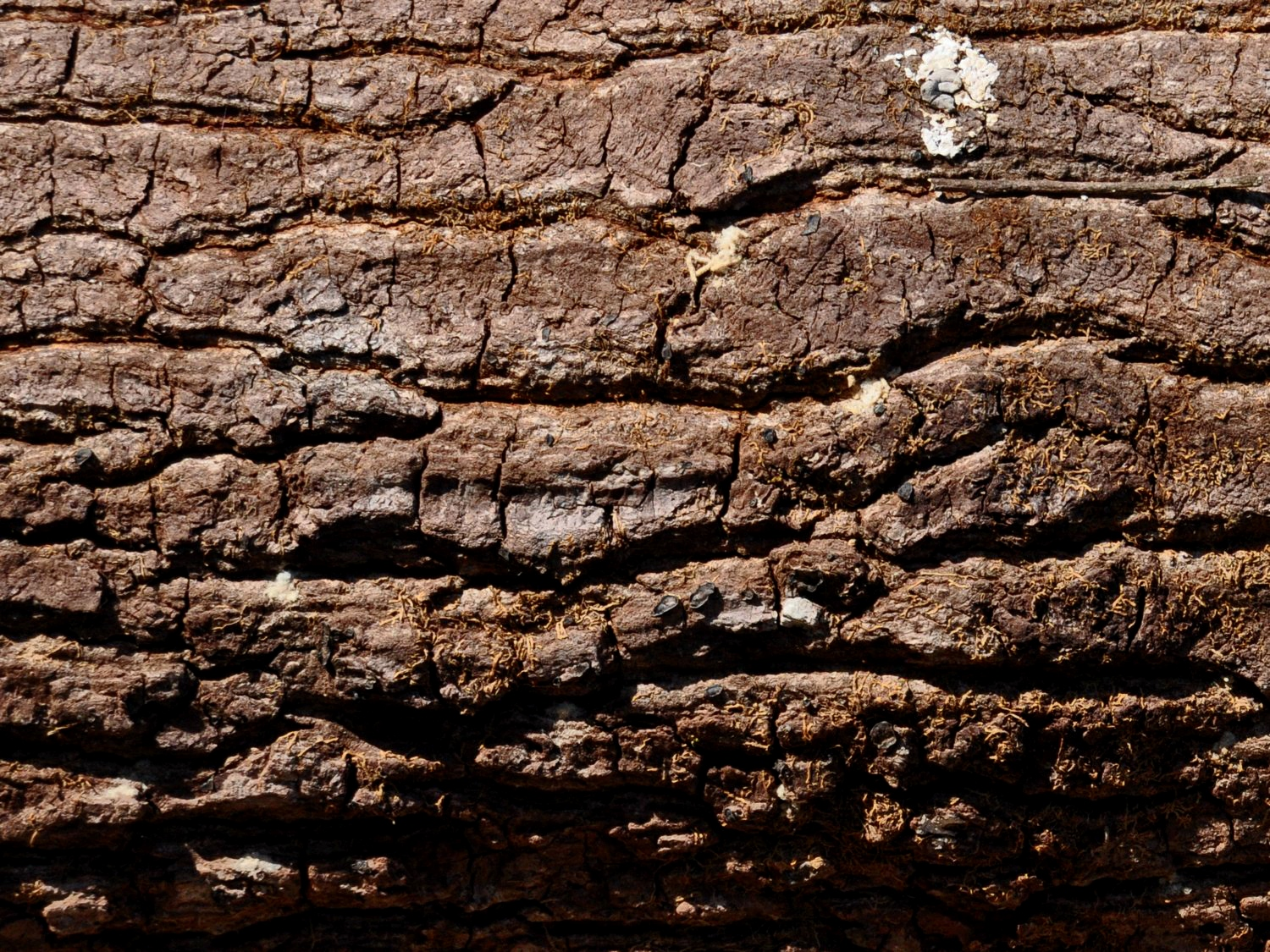
bark

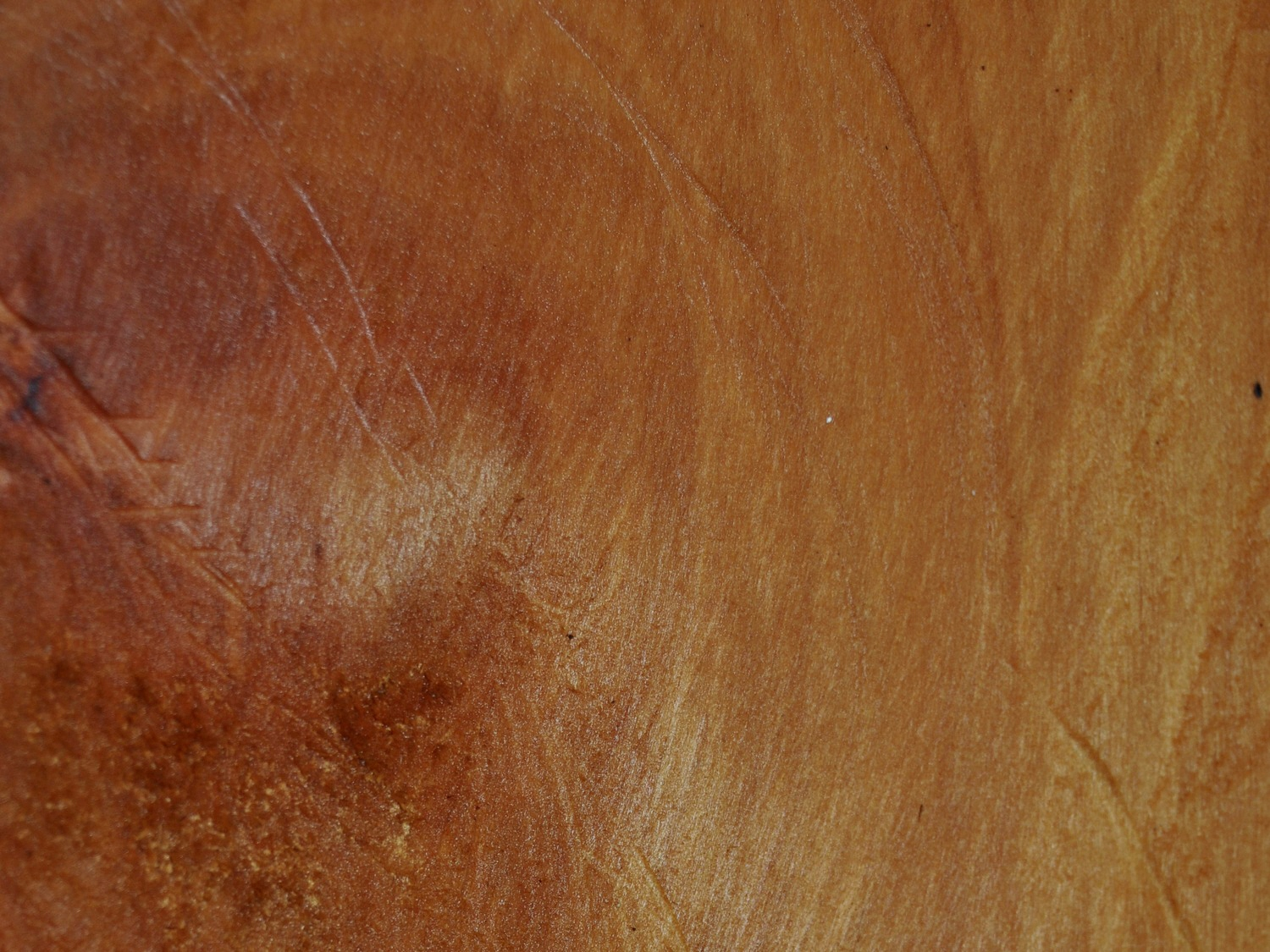
heartwood
