= Suzhuang, Zhejiang =

Suzhuang 苏庄镇
- Town
- Location in Zhejiang
- Coordinates: 29°10′36″N 118°07′10″E
- Country: People's Republic of China
- Province: Zhejiang
- Prefecture-level city: Quzhou
- County: Kaihua County
- Time zone: UTC+8 (China Standard)

Suzhuang (Chinese: 苏庄; pinyin: sūzhuāng) is a town in Kaihua County, Quzhou City, Zhejiang Province, China. As of 2020, it administers the following 11 villages:

- Suzhuang Village
- Tangtou Village (唐头村)
- Gaokeng Village (高坑村)
- Xixi Village (溪西村)
- Yu Village (余村)
- Hengzhong Village (横中村)
- Fangpo Village (方坡村)
- Gutian Village (古田村)
- Maotan Village (毛坦村)
- Fuhu Village (富户村)
- Mingfu Village (茗富村)
