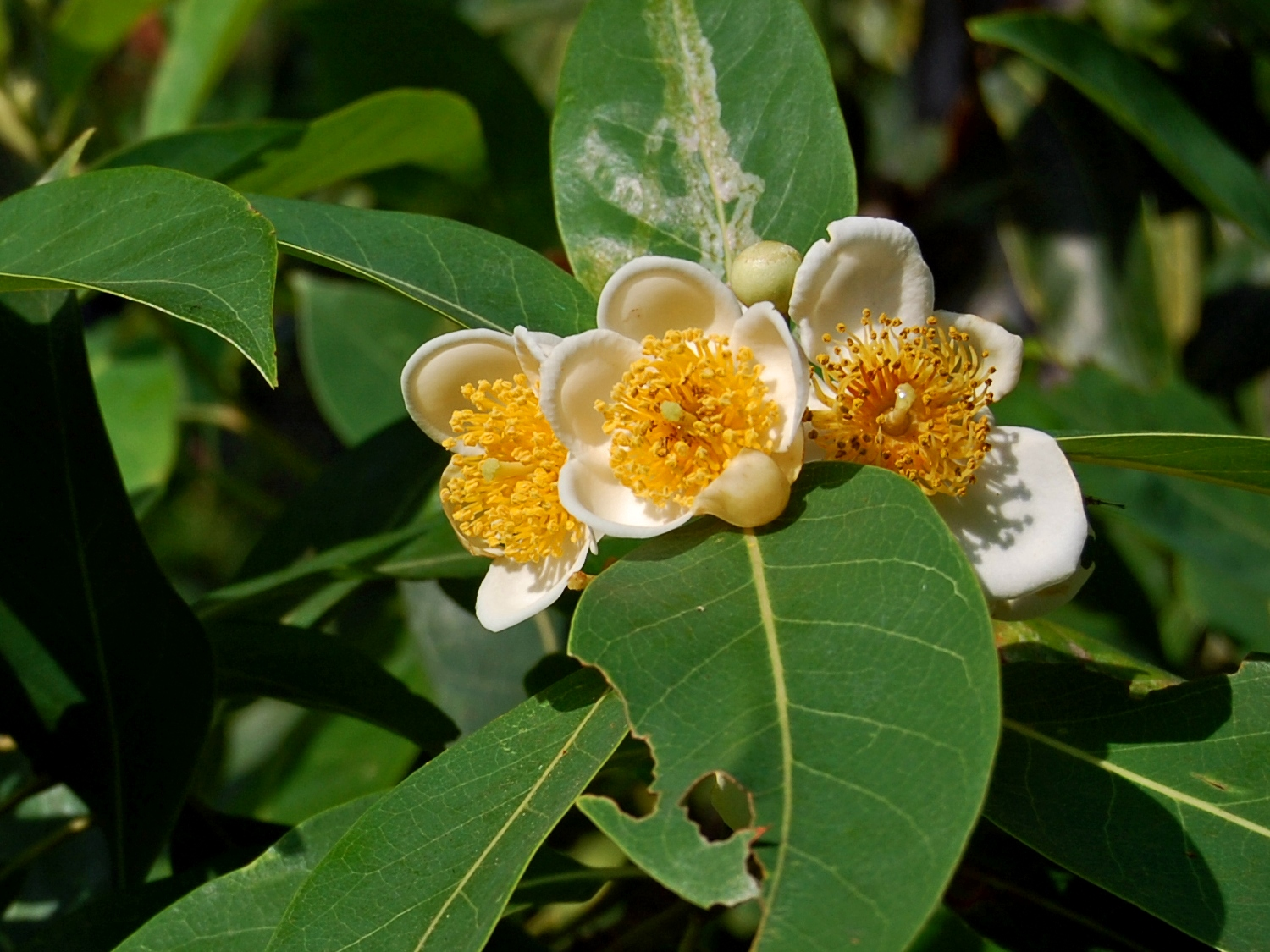
- Flowers and leaves of Schima wallichii

Scientific classification
- Kingdom: Plantae
- Clade: Embryophytes
- Clade: Tracheophytes
- Clade: Spermatophytes
- Clade: Angiosperms
- Clade: Eudicots
- Clade: Asterids
- Order: Ericales
- Family: Theaceae
- Genus: Schima; Reinw. ex Blume

Species
- See text

= Schima =

Genus of trees

Schima is a genus of evergreen trees belonging to the tea family, Theaceae.

The genus inhabits warm temperate to subtropical climates across southern and southeastern Asia, from the eastern Himalaya of Nepal and eastern India across Indochina, southern China, Taiwan, and the Ryukyu Islands. There are about 17 species, among which Schima superba is the most common.

== Fossil record ==
Fossil fruits of Schima have been described as †Schima nanlinensis, from the Miocene of Nanlin Formation in Longchuan Basin, Dehong Autonomous Prefecture, Yunnan, China. The fossil fruits are 5-loculed capsules with flat reniform seeds. The genus Schima is known as fossils from the Palaeogene and Neogene of Germany and Austria. †Schima nanlinensis represents the first fossil record of the genus in Asia.

== Species ==
As of March 2025, the following species are accepted:

Image	Scientific name	Distribution
	Schima argentea E.Pritz. 1900	China (Guangxi, Jiangxi, Sichuan, Yunnan), Myanmar, Vietnam
	Schima arunachaleana H.B.Naithani & Kishwan	India (Arunachal Pradesh)
	Schima brevifolia (Hook.f.) Baill. ex Stapf	Borneo
	Schima brevipedicellata Hung T.Chang	China (Guangdong, Guangxi, Guizhou, Hunan, Jiangxi, Sichuan, Yunnan), Vietnam
	Schima crenata Korth.	Cambodia, China (Hainan), Laos, Malaya, Thailand, Vietnam
	Schima khasiana Dyer	China (Xizang, Yunnan), Bhutan, India, Myanmar, Vietnam
	Schima lobbii (Hook.f.) Pierre	Borneo
	Schima mertensiana (Siebold & Zucc.) Koidz.	Ogasawara-shoto
	Schima multibracteata Hung T.Chang	China (Guangxi)
	Schima noronhae Reinw. ex Blume	China (Yunnan), Jawa, Laos, Malaya, Myanmar, Thailand, Vietnam
	Schima parviflora Hung T.Chang & W.C.Cheng	China (Guizhou, Hubei, Hunan, Sichuan)
	Schima remotiserrata Hung T.Chang	China (Fujian, Guangdong, E Guangxi, S Hunan, Jiangxi)
	Schima sericans (Hand.-Mazz.) T.L.Ming	China (Xizang, Yunnan)
	Schima sinensis (Hemsl. & E.H.Wilson) Airy Shaw	China (Guangxi, Guizhou, Hubei, Hunan, Sichuan, Yunnan)
	Schima superba Gardner & Champ.	China (Anhui, Fujian, Guangdong, Guangxi, Guizhou, Hainan, Hubei, Hunan, Jiangxi, Taiwan, Zhejiang), Japan (Ryukyu Islands)
	Schima villosa Hu	China (Yunnan)
	Schima wallichii (DC.) Korth.	China (Guangxi, Guizhou, Xizang, Yunnan), Bhutan, India, Laos, Myanmar, Nepal, Thailand, Vietnam
