= Longyou Caves =

Artificial cave system in China

Coordinates: 29.06157°N 119.18403°E

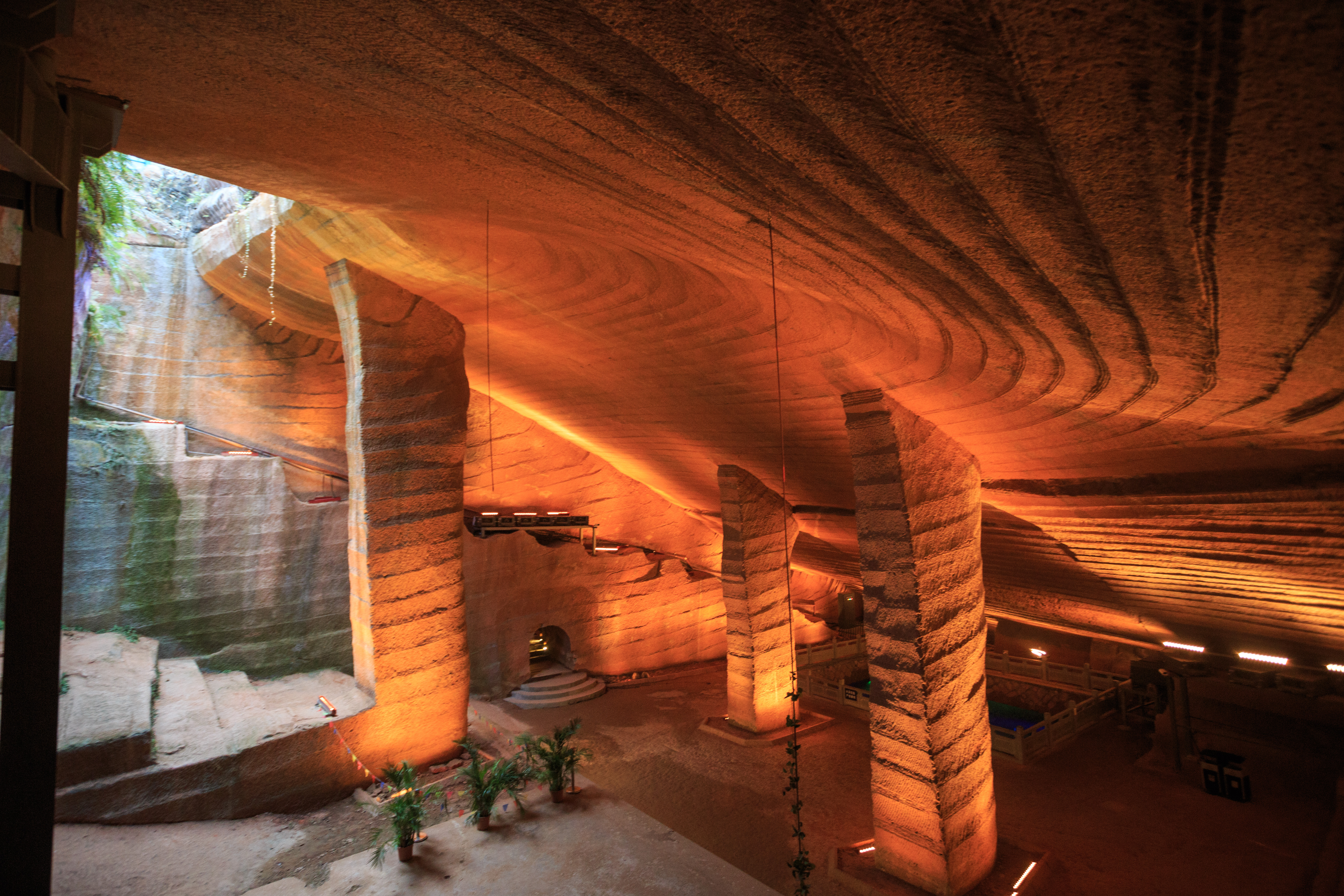
One of the caves

The Longyou Caves (Chinese: 龙游石窟), also called the Xiaonanhai Stone Chambers (Chinese: 小南海石室), are a group of 24 artificial sandstone caverns located at Fenghuang Hill, near the village of Shiyan Beicun on the Qu River in Longyou County, Quzhou City, Zhejiang Province, China. It is unknown when the caves were created; they are mentioned in a 17th-century poem by the Yu Xun, and clay from pots dated to between 206BC and 23 AD were found in silt within the caves.

== Discovery ==
In June 1992, four farmers in Longyou found the caves when they drained the water of five small ponds in their village. The ponds turned out to be five large manmade caverns. Further investigation revealed 19 more caverns nearby. They have been determined to be more than 2000 years old and their construction is not recorded in any historical documents.

About 200 km (120 mi) to the northwest, the Huashan Grottoes at the riverbanks of the Xin'an River somewhat resemble the Longyou Caves but are likely to have been built more than 1,500 years later during the late Ming Dynasty (1551–1667 AD).

== Description ==
The caves are notable in several respects:

- The caves are very large for human-made excavations: The average floor area of each cave is over 1,000 m^{2} (11,000 sq ft), with ceiling heights of up to 30 m (98 ft), and the total area covered in excess of 30,000 m^{2} (320,000 sq ft).
- The ceiling, wall, and pillar surfaces are all finished in the same manner: A series of parallel bands or courses, about 60 cm (24 in) wide, containing parallel chiselling marks set at an angle of about 60° to the axis of the course.
- The caves' ceilings, walls, and pillars have remained whole since they were constructed, with no apparent damage or loss of structural integrity.
- Although near each other, uniform in construction and design, and apparently made for the same unknown purpose, the caves have no cross-connecting passages, even though excavating a small tunnel would have required very little effort compared to the task undertaken to excavate any one cave.

== Gallery ==
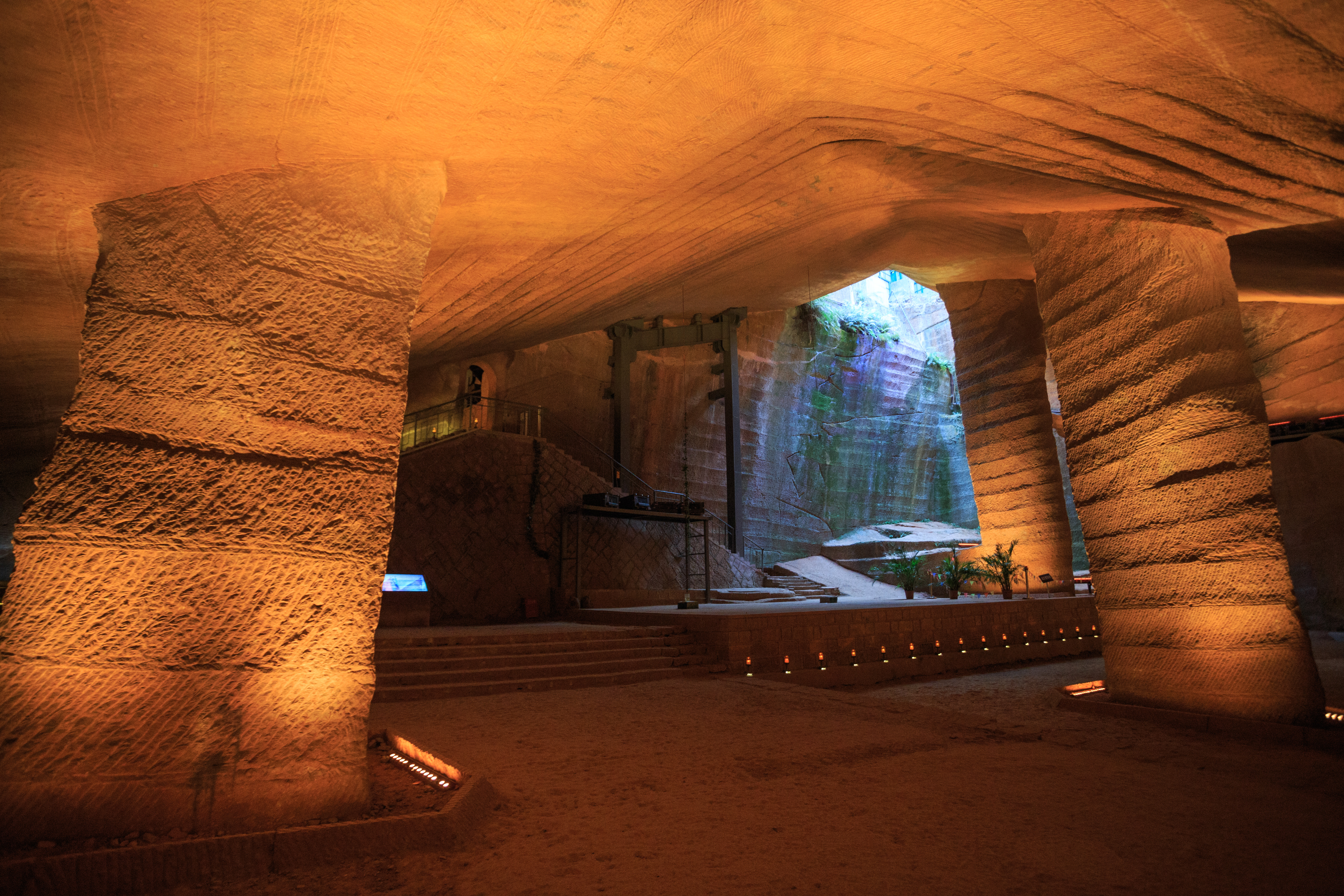

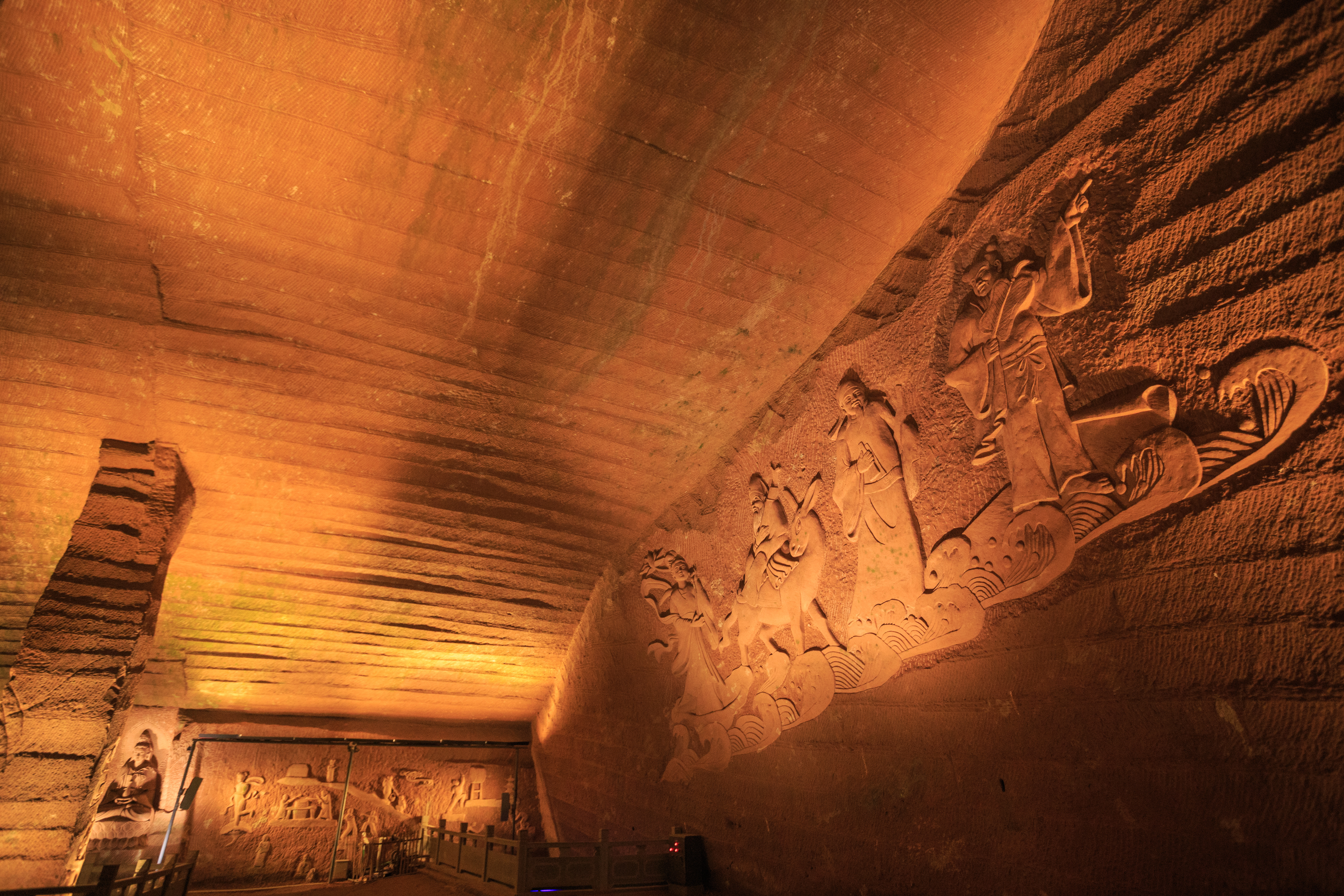

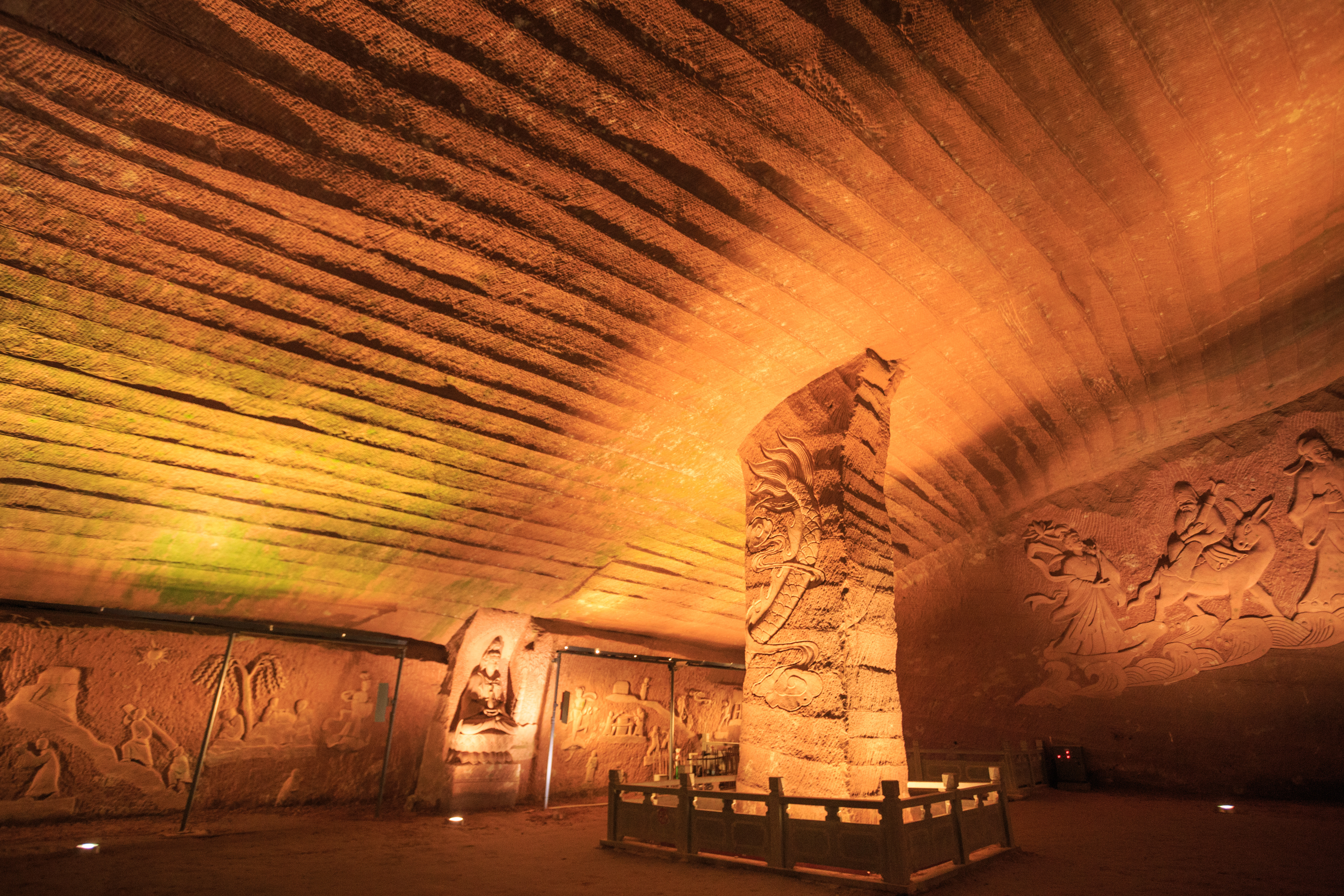

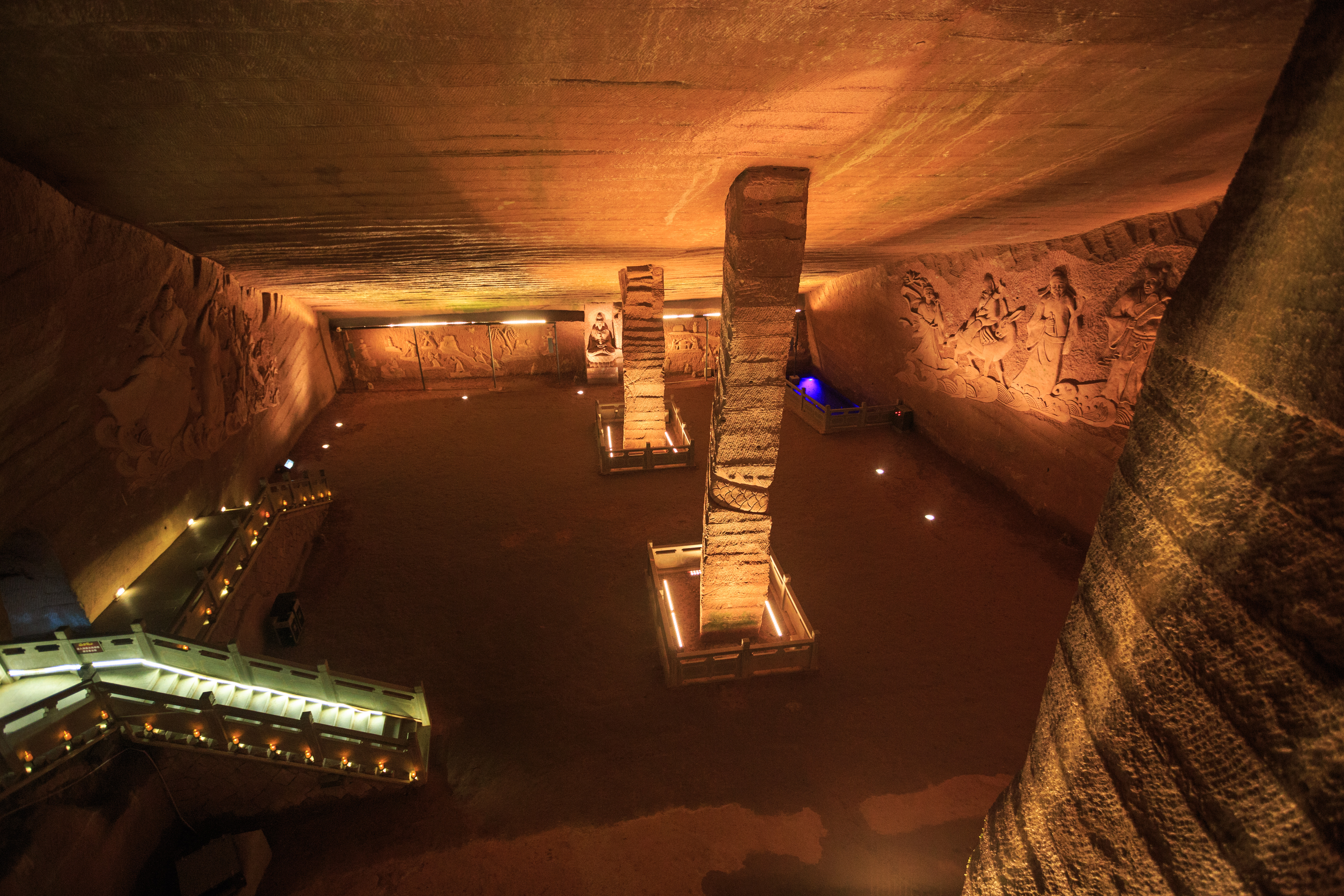
