= Kaihua County =

Kaihua 开化县 Kaihwa
- County
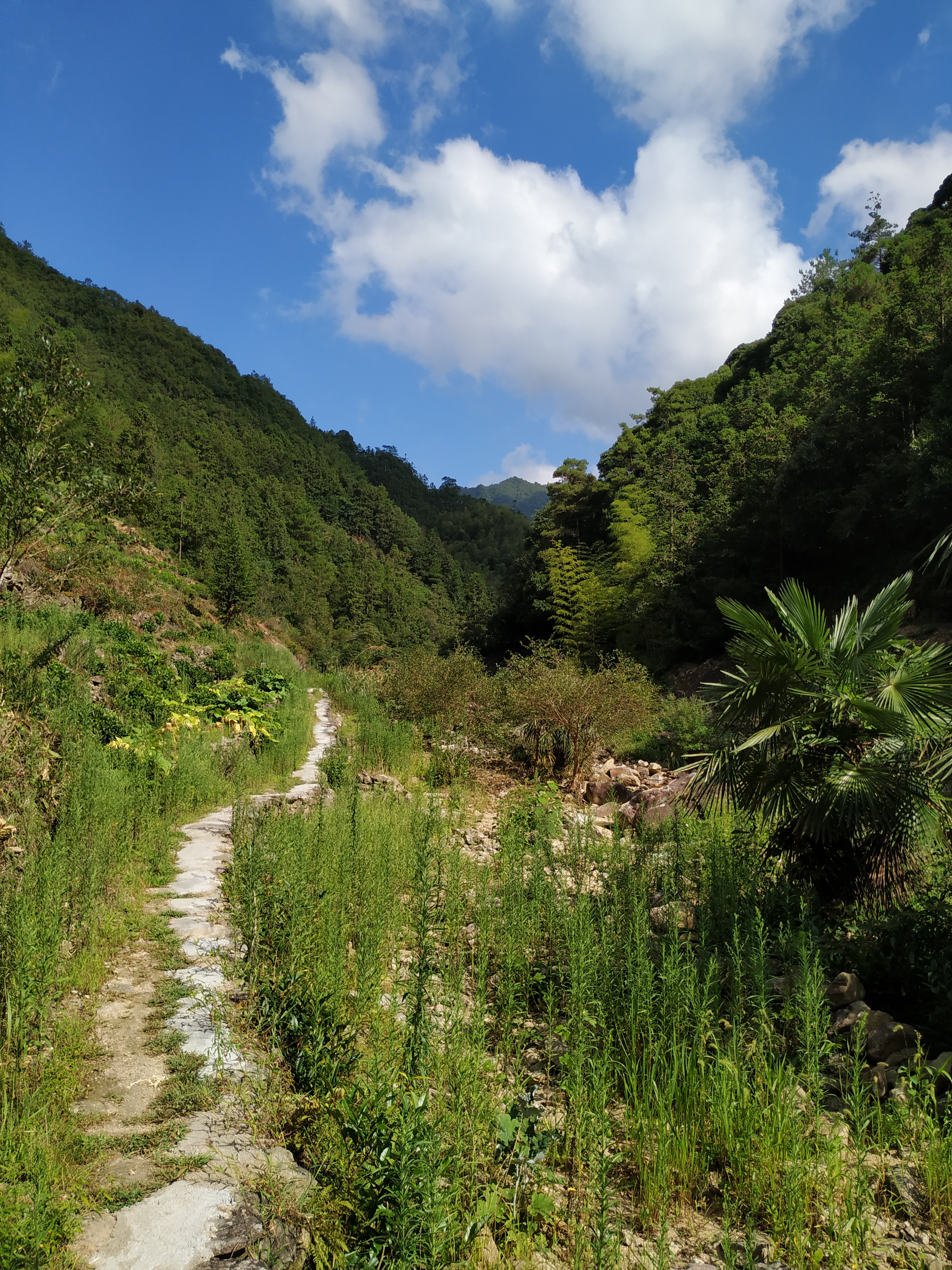

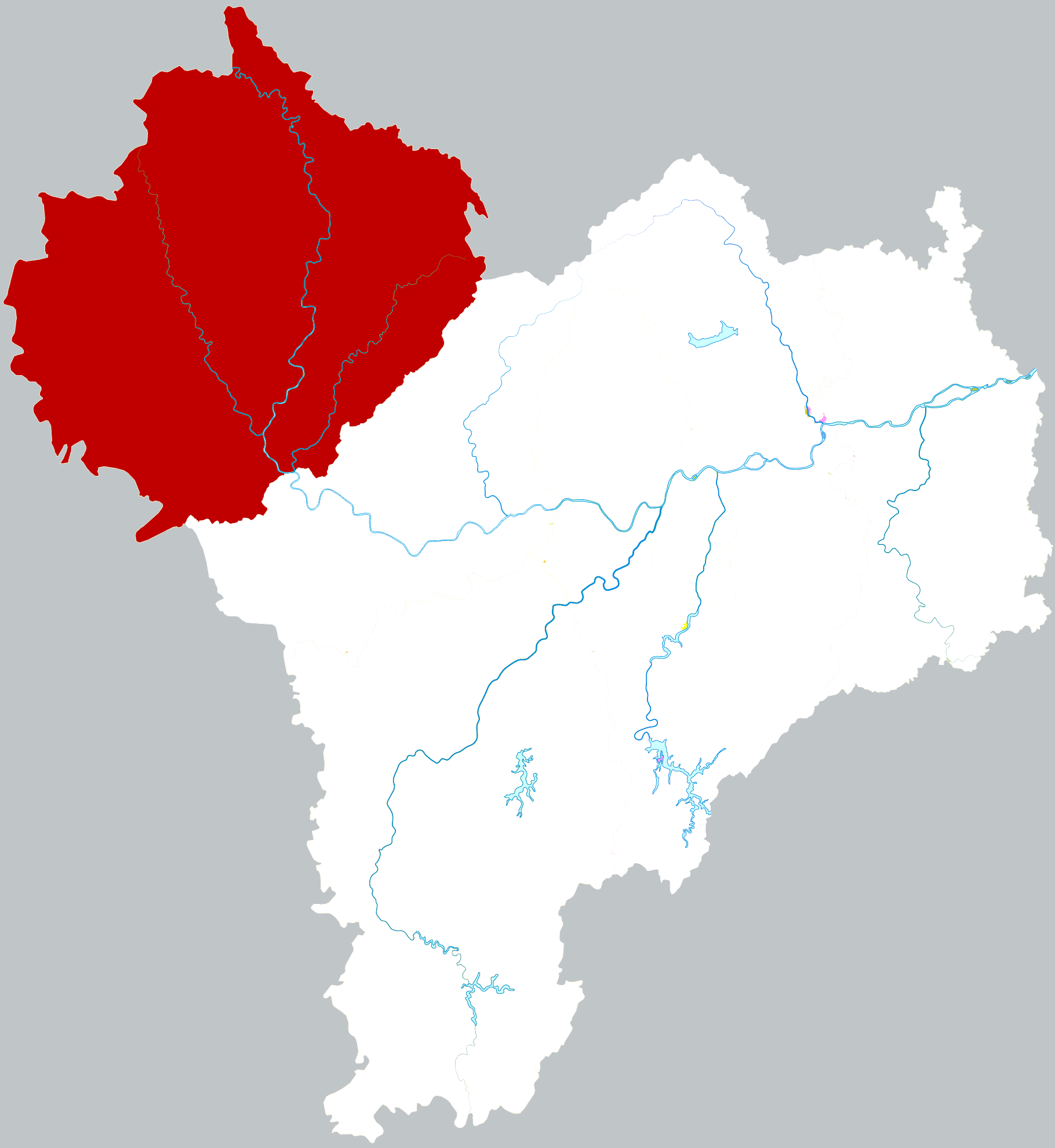
- Location of Kaihua County within Quzhou

- Location of the seat in Zhejiang
- Coordinates: 29°08′14″N 118°24′55″E
- Country: People's Republic of China
- Province: Zhejiang
- Prefecture-level city: Quzhou

Area
  - Total: 2,224 km^{2} (859 sq mi)

Population (2004)
  - Total: 340,000
  - Density: 150/km^{2} (400/sq mi)
- Time zone: UTC+8 (China Standard)

Kaihua County (simplified Chinese: 开化县; traditional Chinese: 開化縣; pinyin: Kāihuà Xiàn) is a county under the jurisdiction of Quzhou city in Zhejiang Province of the People's Republic of China. It is located in the westernmost portion of Zhejiang, and is the source of the Qiantang River. The district's total area is 2224 square kilometers, and its population is 340,000 people. The district's postal code is 324300. The district government is located at 54 Jiefang Street, in the town of Chengguan. Forests cover 79.2% of Kaihua County, making it a key county for forestry in Zhejiang and in China as a whole.

Gutianshan National Nature Reserve is located within Kaihua County.

== Administrative regions ==
The county administers nine towns and nine rural villages.

Towns: Chengguan, Huabu, Majin, Chihuai, Cuntou, Tongcun, Yanglin, Suzhuang, and Qixi.

Rural villages: Yinkeng, Linshan, Zhongcun, Jincun, Zhangwan, Changjiang, Hetian, Tangwu, and Daxibian.

== Climate ==
Climate data for Kaihua, elevation 154 m (505 ft), (1991–2020 normals, extremes 1981–2010)
Month	Jan	Feb	Mar	Apr	May	Jun	Jul	Aug	Sep	Oct	Nov	Dec	Year
Record high °C (°F)	25.0 (77.0)	27.5 (81.5)	33.5 (92.3)	34.2 (93.6)	36.3 (97.3)	37.2 (99.0)	40.1 (104.2)	39.6 (103.3)	39.3 (102.7)	36.4 (97.5)	31.4 (88.5)	24.4 (75.9)	40.1 (104.2)
Mean daily maximum °C (°F)	10.2 (50.4)	12.7 (54.9)	16.7 (62.1)	22.7 (72.9)	27.2 (81.0)	29.2 (84.6)	33.5 (92.3)	33.4 (92.1)	29.7 (85.5)	24.7 (76.5)	18.9 (66.0)	12.9 (55.2)	22.6 (72.8)
Daily mean °C (°F)	5.3 (41.5)	7.4 (45.3)	11.1 (52.0)	16.7 (62.1)	21.5 (70.7)	24.3 (75.7)	27.8 (82.0)	27.6 (81.7)	23.9 (75.0)	18.5 (65.3)	12.7 (54.9)	7.0 (44.6)	17.0 (62.6)
Mean daily minimum °C (°F)	2.2 (36.0)	4.0 (39.2)	7.4 (45.3)	12.7 (54.9)	17.4 (63.3)	21.1 (70.0)	23.8 (74.8)	23.7 (74.7)	20.0 (68.0)	14.4 (57.9)	8.8 (47.8)	3.3 (37.9)	13.2 (55.8)
Record low °C (°F)	−8.2 (17.2)	−6.9 (19.6)	−5.8 (21.6)	0.6 (33.1)	8.3 (46.9)	11.8 (53.2)	18.0 (64.4)	16.6 (61.9)	9.8 (49.6)	1.5 (34.7)	−4.5 (23.9)	−10.3 (13.5)	−10.3 (13.5)
Average precipitation mm (inches)	96.9 (3.81)	109.2 (4.30)	194.7 (7.67)	224.4 (8.83)	241.3 (9.50)	396.6 (15.61)	215.2 (8.47)	130.1 (5.12)	84.0 (3.31)	54.4 (2.14)	86.1 (3.39)	69.3 (2.73)	1,902.2 (74.88)
Average precipitation days (≥ 0.1 mm)	14.4	13.6	17.7	17.3	16.8	18.5	13.4	13.4	9.4	7.5	10.3	11.0	163.3
Average snowy days	3.3	1.9	0.6	0	0	0	0	0	0	0	0.1	1.3	7.2
Average relative humidity (%)	81	81	81	80	81	85	81	79	79	77	81	80	81
Mean monthly sunshine hours	85.9	86.8	98.6	120.6	139.2	110.1	201.7	193.2	162.0	153.5	120.0	116.0	1,587.6
Percentage possible sunshine	26	27	27	31	33	26	47	48	44	44	38	37	36
Source: China Meteorological Administration

== Tourist attractions ==
Qianjiangyuan National Forest Park is a famous scenic spot in the county.
