= Kecheng, Quzhou =

Kecheng 柯城区
- District
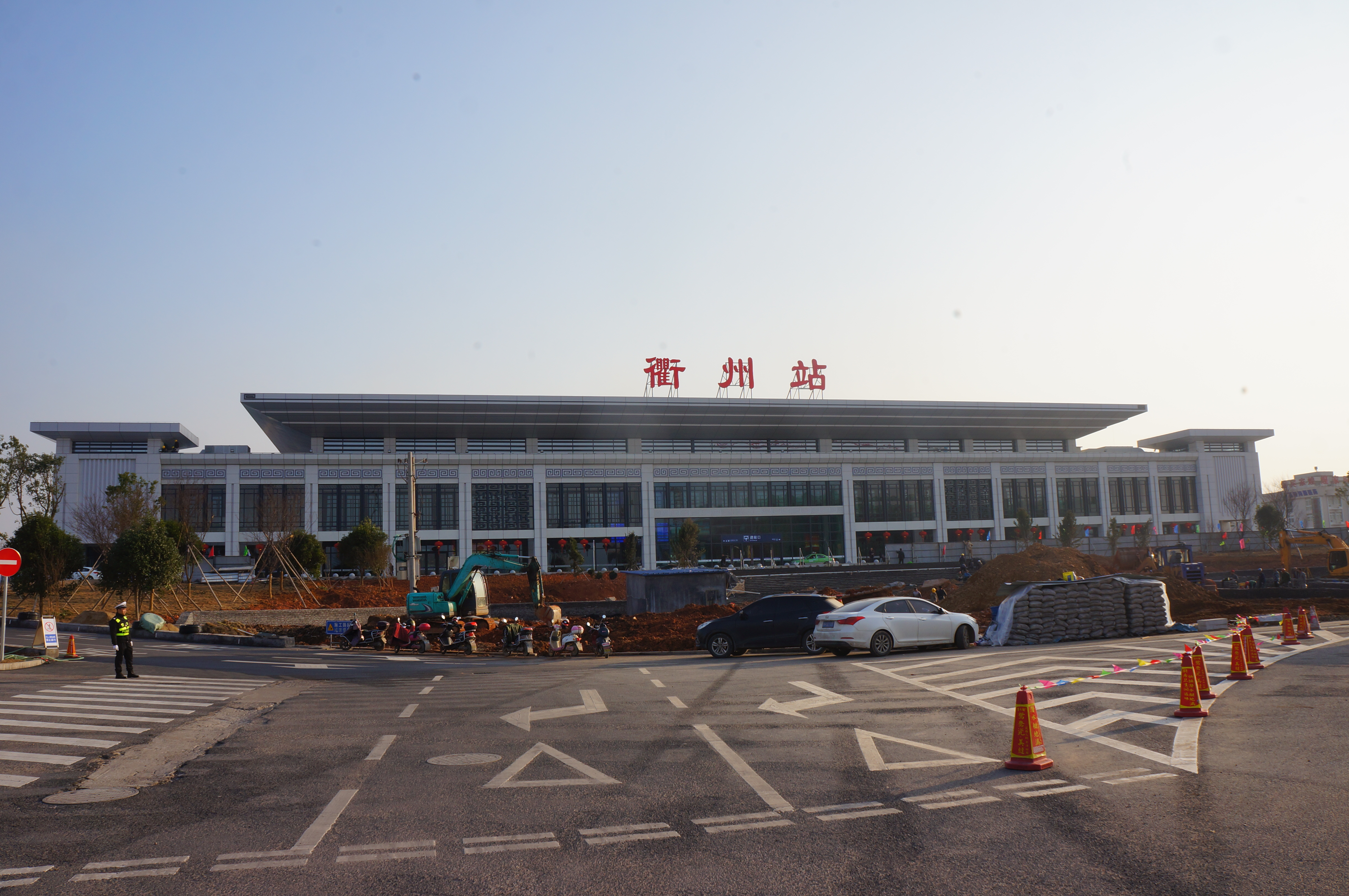
- Quzhou railway station

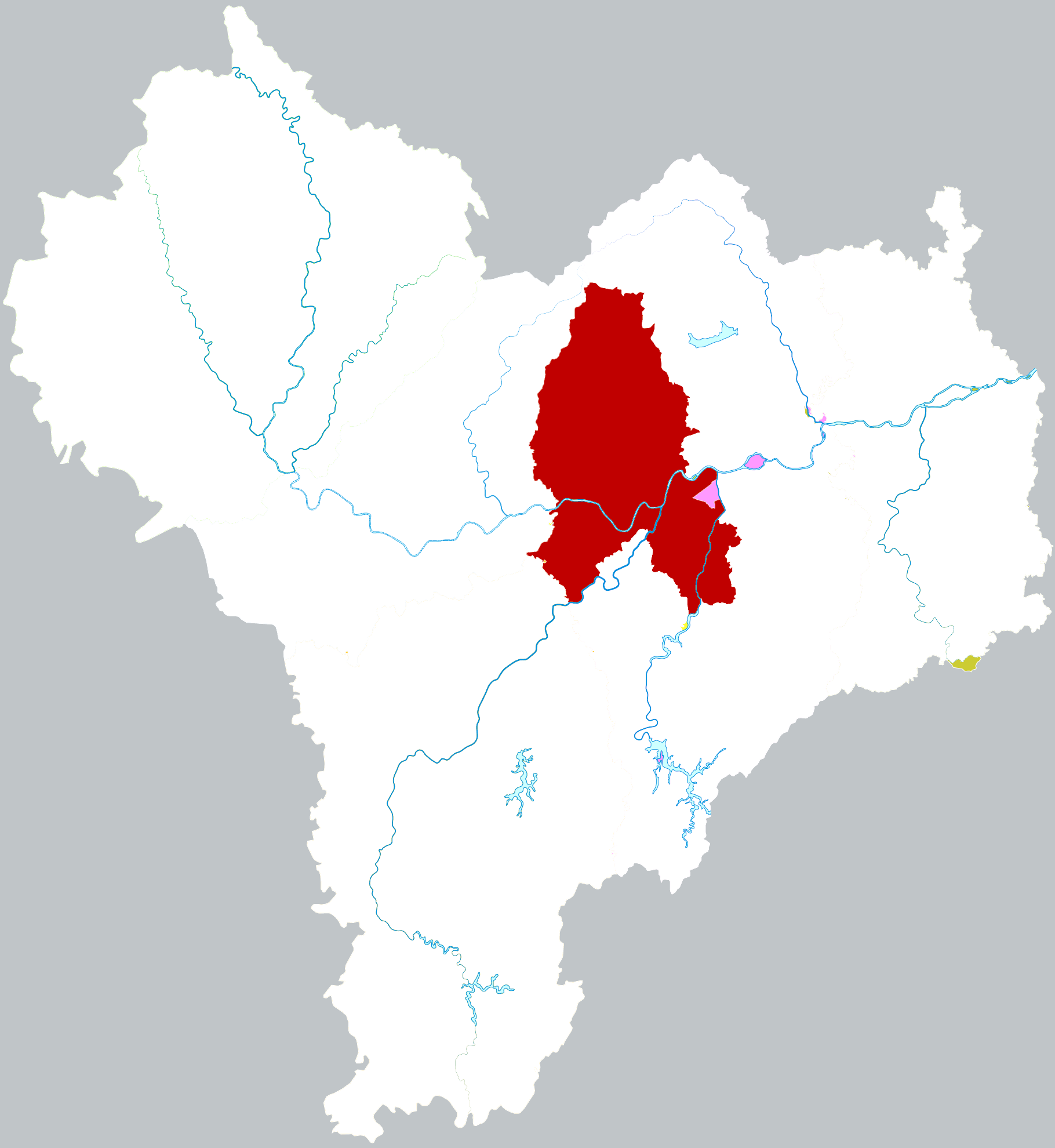
- Location of Kecheng District within Quzhou

- Location in Zhejiang
- Coordinates: 28°58′N 118°50′E
- Country: People's Republic of China
- Province: Zhejiang
- Prefecture-level city: Quzhou

Area
  - Total: 606.57 km^{2} (234.20 sq mi)

Population (2020)
  - Total: 528,847
  - Density: 871.86/km^{2} (2,258.1/sq mi)
- Time zone: UTC+8 (China Standard)

Kecheng (Chinese: 柯城区; pinyin: Kēchéng) is a district of the city of Quzhou, Zhejiang Province, China. From the Tang dynasty to 1912, it was known as Xi'an County. After 1912, it was known as Qu County.

== Administrative divisions ==
As of 2020, Kecheng District has 8 subdistricts, 2 towns and 8 townships under its administration.

Subdistricts:

- Fushan Subdistrict (府山街道), Hehua Subdistrict (荷花街道), Huayuan Subdistrict (花园街道), Xin'an Subdistrict (信安街道), Baiyun Subdistrict (白云街道), Shuanggang Subdistrict (双港街道), Xinxin Subdistrict (新新街道), Quhua Subdisteict (衢化街道)

Towns:

- Shiliang (石梁镇), Hangbu (航埠镇)

Townships:

- Wantian Township (万田乡), Shishi Township (石室乡), Huangjia Township (黄家乡), Jiangjiashan Township (姜家山乡), Jiuhua Township (九华乡), Qili Township (七里乡), Huashu Township (华墅乡), Gouxi Township (沟溪乡)

== Tourism ==
The district is rich in cultural traditions, such as the Mapeng Catholic Church.
