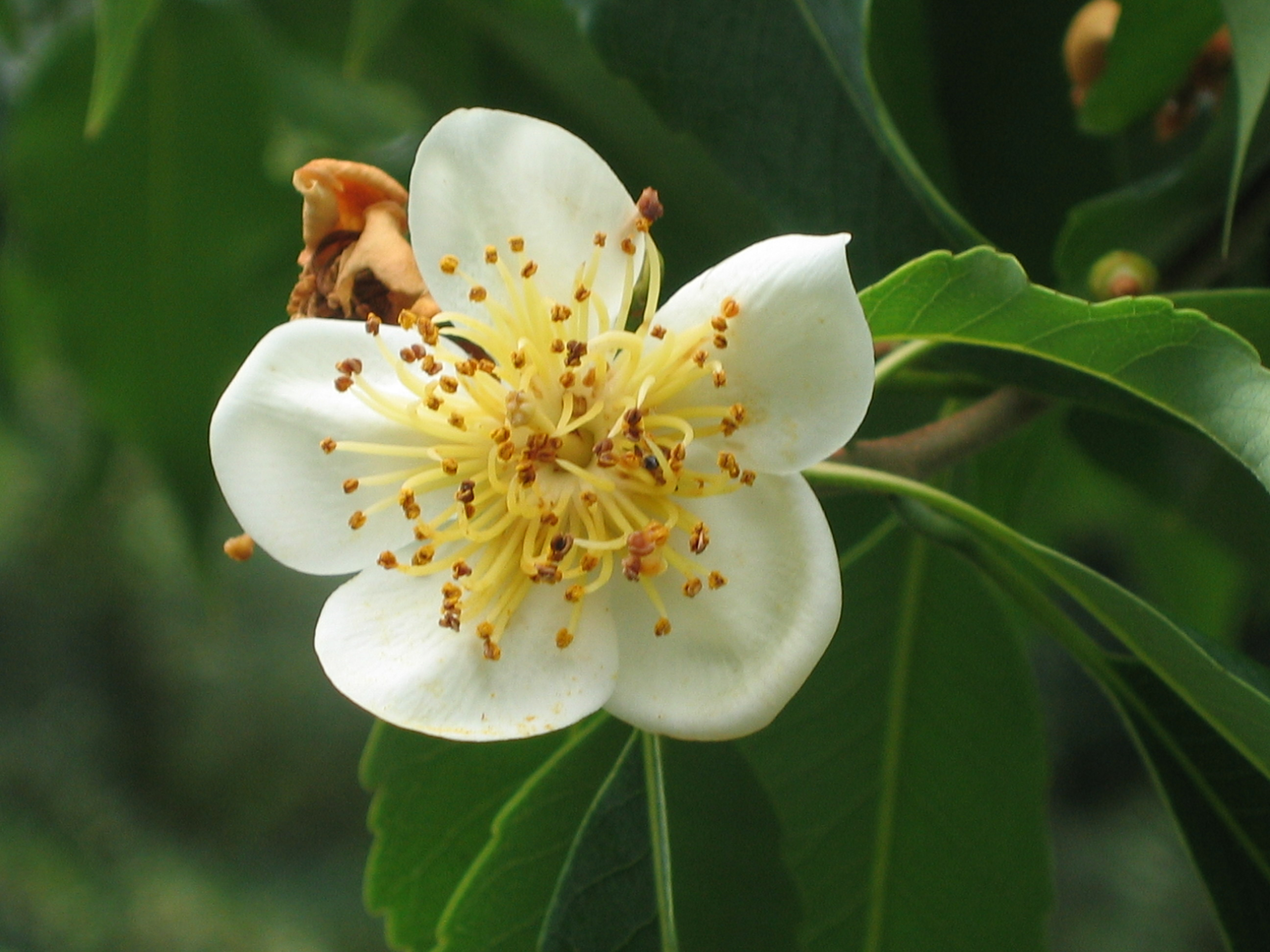
- Close-up of flower
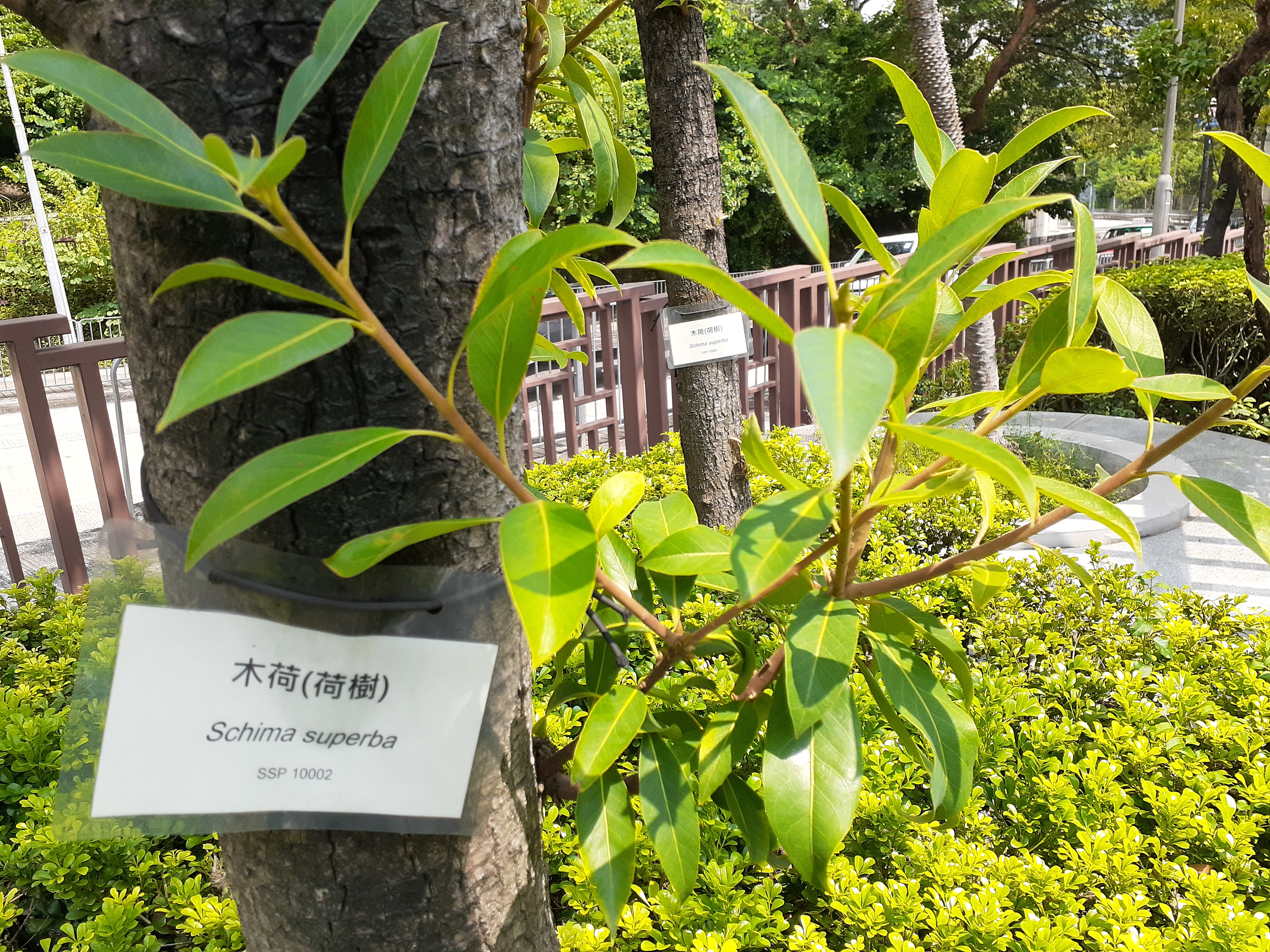
- Foliage and trunk

Conservation status
- Least Concern (IUCN 3.1)

Scientific classification
- Kingdom: Plantae
- Clade: Embryophytes
- Clade: Tracheophytes
- Clade: Spermatophytes
- Clade: Angiosperms
- Clade: Eudicots
- Clade: Asterids
- Order: Ericales
- Family: Theaceae
- Genus: Schima
- Species: S. superba

Binomial name
- Schima superba Gardner & Champ.

Synonyms
- Schima confertiflora Merr.; Schima kankaoensis Hayata; Schima liukiuensis Nakai; Schima wallichii subsp. liukiuensis (Nakai) Bloemb.; Schima wallichii var. superba (Gardner & Champ.) Bloemb.; Schima xinyiensis Hung T.Chang & Z.Y.Su

= Schima superba =

Species of flowering plant

Schima superba is a species of flowering plant in the tea family Theaceae, native to subtropical areas of Vietnam, southern China, Hainan, Taiwan, and the Ryukyu Islands. With Pinus massoniana it often dominates forests from 100 to 800 m (300 to 2,600 ft) in elevation. It is used as a street tree in a number of southern Chinese cities.

S. superba has a long history; in China, it has been described as early as in the "Classic of Mountains and Seas", and it is one of the "sacred trees" in this classic text. S. superba is a precious and multi-purpose tree species.

== Description ==
S. superba is a large evergreen tree with a straight and strong trunk. Its tree height can reach 30 meters (98 ft), diameter at breast height 1.2 meters (3 ft 11 in). The leaves are leathery, oval, 7–12 cm (2.8–4.7 in) long, often densely grown on the tip of the branches. The flowers are white, hermaphrodite, 3 cm in diameter, often racemosely crowded on the tip of the branchlets or in the axils of the top leaves of the branches. The flowers are fragrant. The fruit is a capsule, globose or subglobose. The seed is flat, reniform, small and light with narrow wings, and falls easily from the husk.

== Uses ==
- Fire prevention

S. superba is an excellent tree species for building fire-proof forest belts in southern China. Its leaves have a high water content, a fire temperature of 450 °C (842 °F), and a low oil content of only 6%, making it non-flammable. Moreover, it is adaptable, grows rapidly, and has a dense and compact canopy. When the forest belt is 14.5 m (48 ft) wide (four rows) and 5–6 m (16–20 ft) high, it can prevent the fire from spreading. Because it often forms forests with Pinus massoniana, Cunninghamia lanceolata and other evergreen broad-leaved trees, it can also have a partial fire-blocking effect.

- Ecological protection

S. superba is an efficient ecological protection tree species in southern China. It has excellent water and soil conservation function. It is a deep rooted tree species with strong adaptability to soil, and can grow healthily in various acidic soils. It can tolerate dryness, barrenness, short-lived low temperatures of −10 °C (14 °F), and heat of 39 °C (102 °F). S. superba is suitable for mixed forest with Pinus massoniana, Cunninghamia lanceolata and other evergreen broad-leaved trees, suitable for low-quality and low-efficiency forests, and suitable for ecological restoration of forest lands after bursaphelenchus xylophilus is eliminated. It is an excellent mixed afforestation or alternative tree species for the regeneration of the second generation of Cunninghamia lanceolata and Pinus massoniana.

- Wood

The wood is hard, dense, less cracked and easy to process. The color of the material is relatively uniform, and the longitudinal section is shiny. It is used for making gunstocks and yarns and cop tubes in the textile industry; it is also used for bridges, ships, buildings, farm tools, furniture, plywood, etc.

- Medicine

"木荷 mù hé/tree-lotus" is the official Chinese name of S. superba. "木荷 mù hé" and "木荷葉 mù hé ye/tree-lotus-leaf" are both names of traditional Chinese medicines, and also medicines for external application. The raw material of "木荷 mù hé" comes from the bark, which can "攻毒/attack poison" and "消腫/reduce swelling". The raw material of "木荷葉mù hé ye" comes from the leaves, which can "解毒/detoxify/" and "療瘡/cure sores/".

- Others

S. superba has a beautiful tree shape, large and fragrant flowers, and is an excellent landscaping plant. It is also a honeyed plant. The bark and leaves contain tannins. According to research, the bark may contain some toxic substances such as saponin, which are highly toxic to cold-blooded animals, certain insects and fish, and can be used to develop pesticides.
