= Qianjiangyuan National Forest Park =

National park in Zhejiang, China

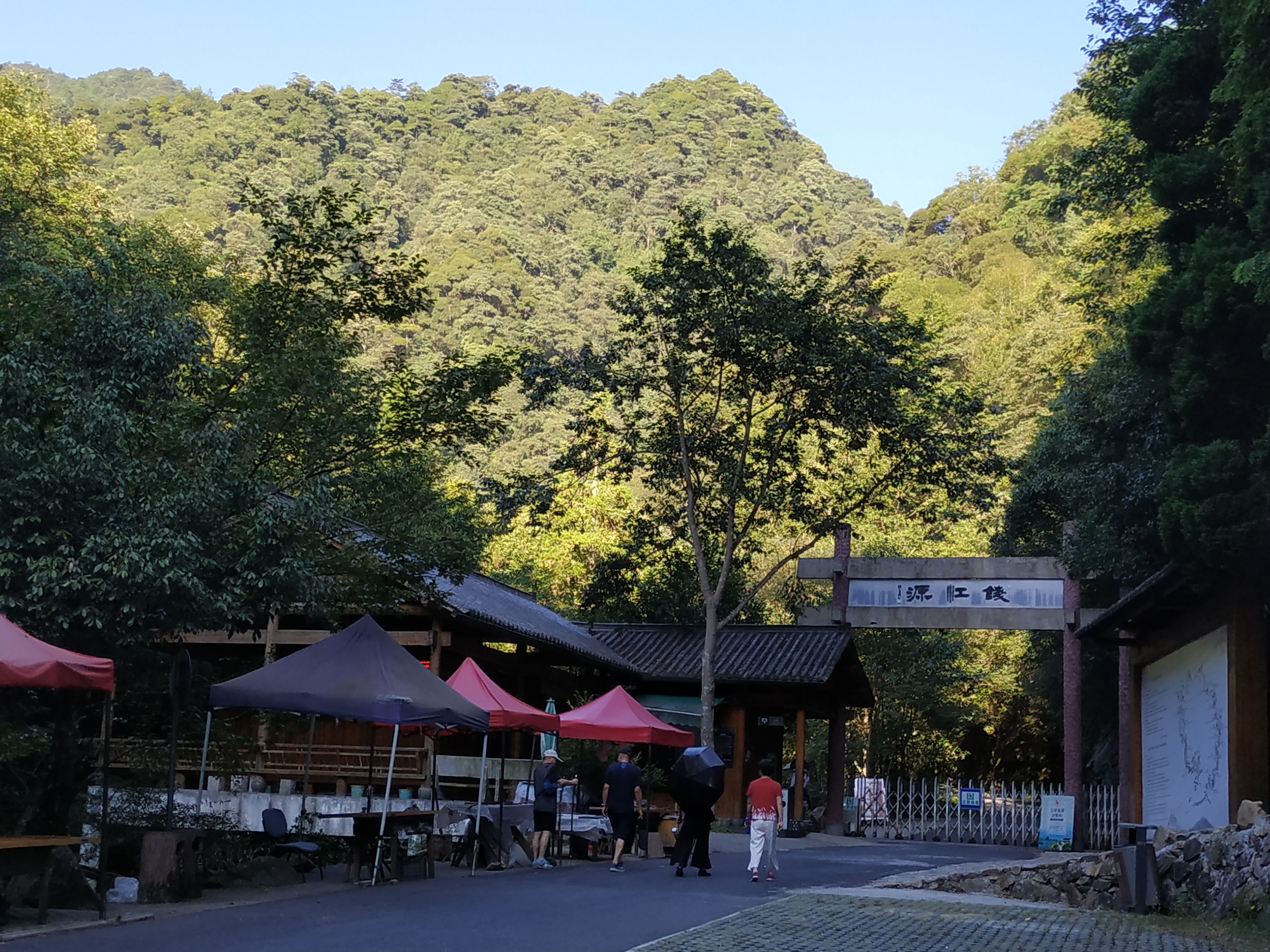
- Entrance of Qianjiangyuan National Forest Park.

- Location within Zhejiang
- Type: National park
- Location: Kaihua County, Zhejiang
- Coordinates: 29°23′25.55″N 118°12′39.72″E
- Area: 45 square kilometres (17 sq mi)
- Created: 1999
- Open: All year

Chinese name
- Simplified Chinese: 钱江源国家森林公园
- Traditional Chinese: 錢江源國家森林公園
Transcriptions
Standard Mandarin
- Hanyu Pinyin: Qián Jiāngyuán Guójiā Sēnlín Gōngyuán

The Qianjiangyuan National Forest Park (Chinese: 钱江源国家森林公园) is a national park in Kaihua County, Zhejiang, China. It has a total area of 45 square kilometres (17 sq mi), of which 42.5 square kilometres (16.4 sq mi) is land and 2.2 square kilometres (0.85 sq mi) is water. It is bordered by Mount Huang on the north, Qiandao Lake on the east, and Mount Sanqing on the west.

== History ==
In December 1992 it has been categorized as a provincial park by the Zhejiang provincial government. In August 1999 it has been designated as a national park by the State Forestry Administration.

== Geography ==
There are over 10 streams and ponds in the park.

The Qixi Reservoir (齐溪水库), with a surface area of 182.5 square kilometres (70.5 sq mi), is available for fishing and boating. It was founded in 1981.

=== Climate ===
Qianjiangyuan National Forest Park is in the subtropical monsoon climate zone and exhibits four distinct seasons. It has an average annual temperature of 16.4 °C (61.5 °F), total annual rainfall of 1,814 mm (71.4 in), a frost-free period of 252 days and annual average sunshine hours in 1712.5 hours. It is known as "China's Amazon rainforest".

It is a very well known and beautiful lake in China.

== Fauna and flora ==
The forest coverage is 97.55%. As of 2014, there are 720 species of woody plants belonging to 287 genera and 98 families in the park.

Within the boundaries of the park, the following number of species are known to live: 58 species of mammals, 104 species of birds, 77 species of reptiles and amphibians. Among them the first rank of national protection has Elliot's pheasant, hairy-fronted muntjac and clouded leopard; the second rank has Hoplobatrachus tigerinus, Mandarin duck, Chinese sparrowhawk, macaque, pangolin, otter, large Indian civet, and small Indian civet.

== See also ==
- List of protected areas of China
