= Quzhou =

Quzhou 衢州市 Chuchow
- Prefecture-level city
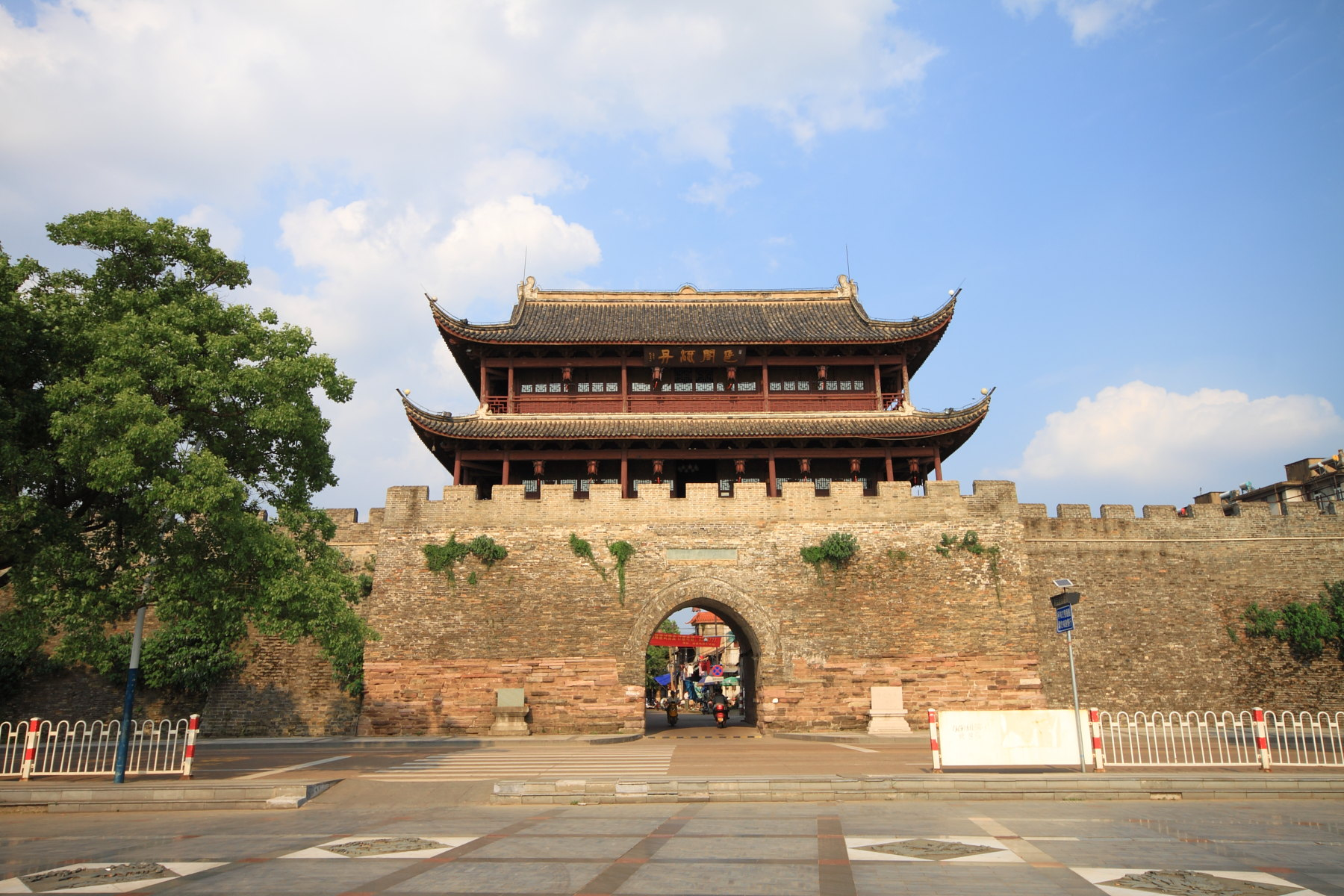
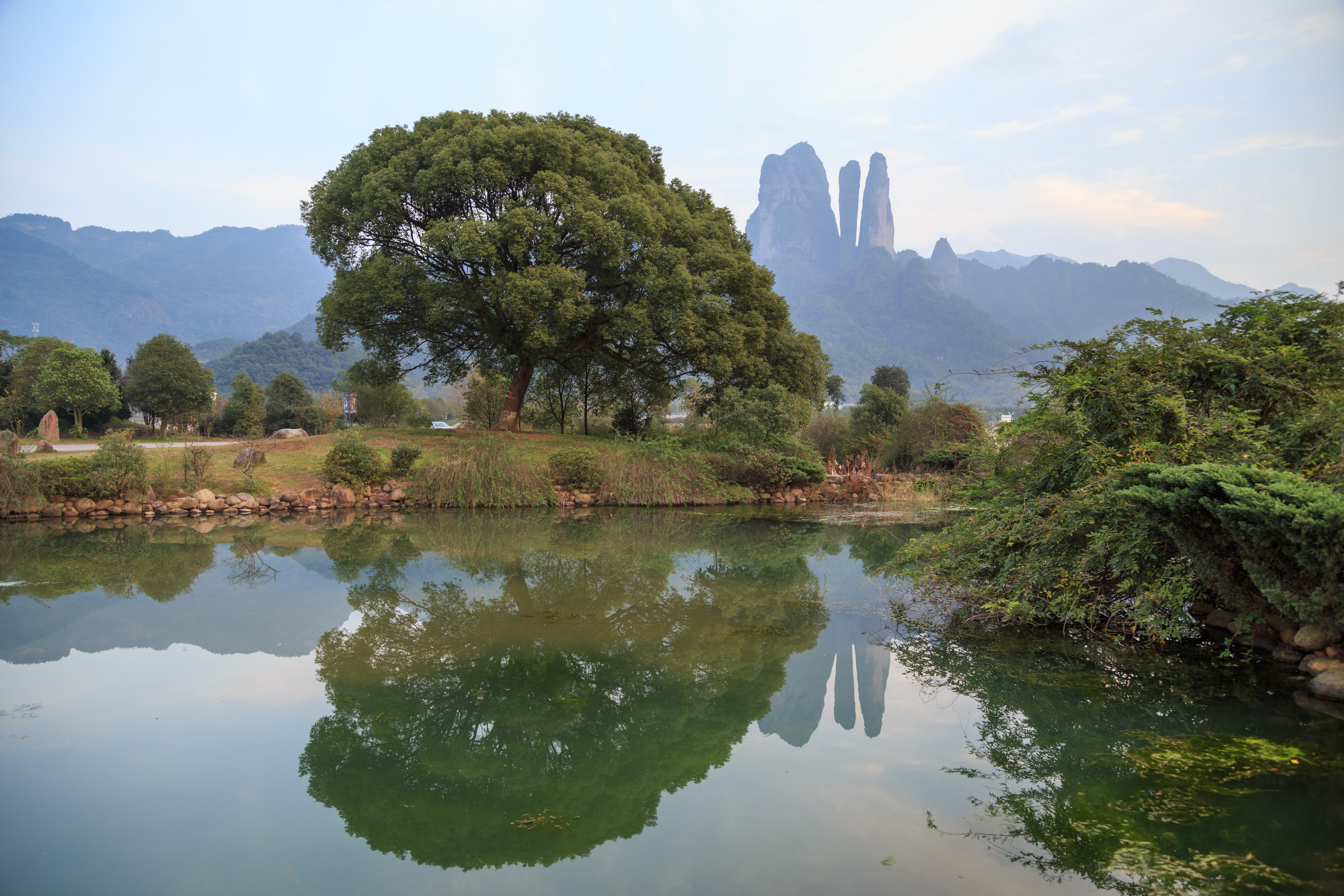
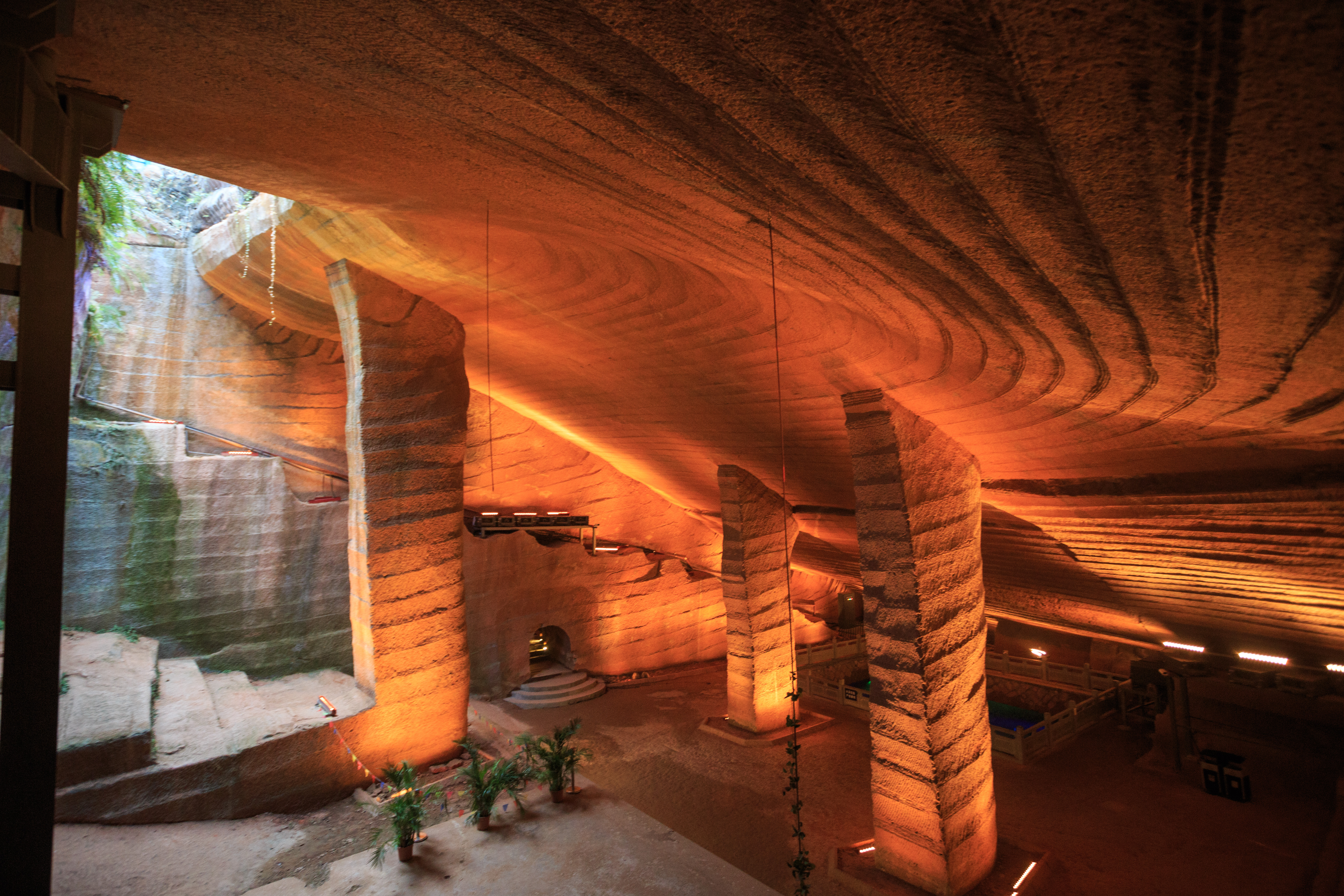
- Shuiting Gate of the Quzhou City Wall Temple of Southern Confucianism Tianwang Temple Qianjiangyuan National Forest Park Wu's Ancestral Hall in Chetang Mount Jianglang Longyou Caves View of Quzhou's skyline on the Qu River

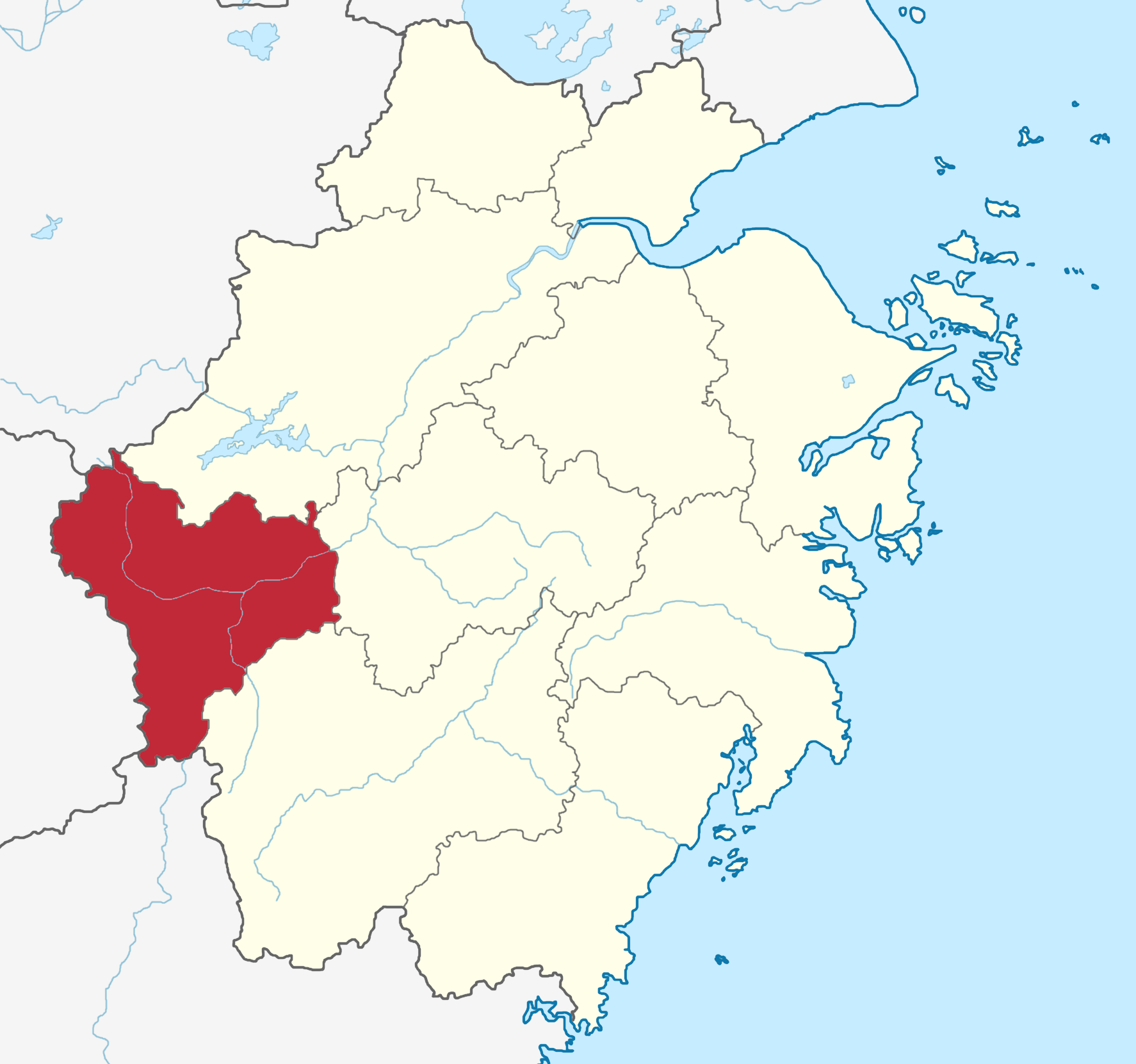
- Location of Quzhou City jurisdiction in Zhejiang

- Location in eastern China Quzhou (China)
- Coordinates (Quzhou municipal government): 28°58′13″N 118°51′33″E
- Country: People's Republic of China
- Province: Zhejiang
- County-level divisions: 6
- Municipal seat: Kecheng District

Government
  - Mayor: Xu Wenguang (徐文光)

Area
  - Prefecture-level city: 8,846 km^{2} (3,415 sq mi)
  - Urban: 3,069 km^{2} (1,185 sq mi)
  - Metro: 1,008.9 km^{2} (389.5 sq mi)

Population (2020 census)
  - Prefecture-level city: 2,276,184
  - Density: 257.3/km^{2} (666.4/sq mi)
  - Urban: 902,767
  - Urban density: 294.2/km^{2} (761.9/sq mi)
  - Metro: 902,767
  - Metro density: 894.80/km^{2} (2,317.5/sq mi)

GDP
  - Prefecture-level city: CN¥ 163.9 billion US$ 22.2 billion
  - Per capita: CN¥ 71,766; US$ 10,115
- Time zone: UTC+8 (China Standard)
- Postal code: 324000
- Area code: 0570
- ISO 3166 code: CN-ZJ-08
- License Plate Prefix: 浙H
- City tree: Camphor
- City flower: Osmanthus
- Website: quzhou.gov.cn

Quzhou
- Chinese: 衢州
Transcriptions
Standard Mandarin
- Hanyu Pinyin: Qúzhōu
- Wade–Giles: Ch‘ü^{2}-chou^{1}
- IPA: [tɕʰy̌.ʈʂóʊ]

Quzhou (Note: In addition to the pinyin and Wade-Giles romanizations of the name given above, Quzhou also appears in historical accounts as Kyu-tcheou-fou and Kiu-tcheou-fou, based on French transcriptions of its name and former status as a prefectural seat.) is a prefecture-level city in western Zhejiang province, People's Republic of China. Sitting on the upper course of the Qiantang River, it borders Hangzhou to the north, Jinhua to the east, Lishui to the southeast, and the provinces of Fujian, Jiangxi and Anhui to the south, southwest and northwest respectively. Its population was 2,276,184 inhabitants as of the 2020 census of whom 902,767 lived in the built-up (or metro) area made of Qujiang and Kecheng urban Districts. Chinese actress and singer Zhou Xun was born in Quzhou.

== History ==
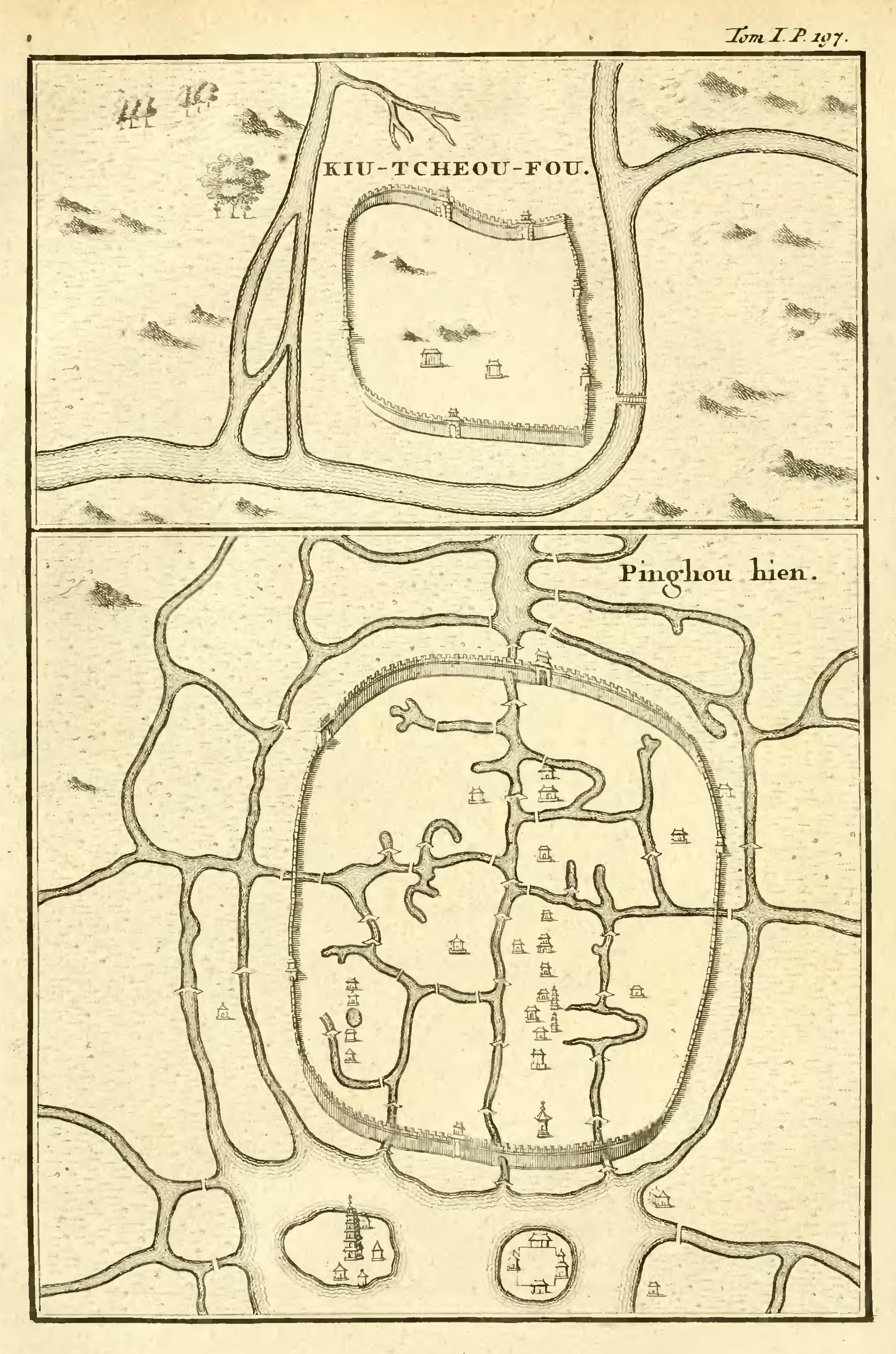
Maps of "Kiu-tcheou-fou" and "Pinghou-hien" from Du Halde's 1736 Description of China, based on Jesuit accounts

=== Descendants of Confucius ===
During the Southern Song dynasty the descendant of Confucius at Qufu, the Duke Yansheng Kong Duanyou fled south with the Song Emperor to Quzhou, while the newly established Jin dynasty (1115–1234) in the north appointed Kong Duanyou's brother Kong Duancao who remained in Qufu as Duke Yansheng. From that time up until the Yuan dynasty, there were two Duke Yanshengs, once in the north in Qufu and the other in the south at Quzhou. An invitation to come back to Qufu was extended to the southern Duke Yansheng Kong Zhu by the Yuan dynasty Emperor Kublai Khan. The title was taken away from the southern branch after Kong Zhu rejected the invitation, so the northern branch of the family kept the title of Duke Yansheng. The southern branch still remained in Quzhou where they lived to this day. Confucius's descendants in Quzhou alone number 30,000. The Hanlin Academy rank of Wujing boshi (五經博士) was awarded to the southern branch at Quzhou by a Ming Emperor while the northern branch at Qufu held the title Duke Yansheng. Kong Ruogu (孔若古) aka Kong Chuan (孔傳) 47th generation was claimed to be the ancestor of the Southern branch after Kong Zhu died by Northern branch member Kong Guanghuang. The leader of the southern branch is Kong Xiangkai (孔祥楷).

=== Second World War ===
During the Second World War, the IJA used bacteriological weapons in Quzhou, spreading plague, typhoid and other diseases in Quzhou, as well as in Ningbo and Changde. As a result, between 1940 and 1948 more than 300,000 Chinese civilians in the area contracted the plague and other diseases; an estimated 50,000 died in Quzhou alone.

On April 18, 1942, hours after bombing Tokyo, six US Army B-25 bombers crash landed near Quzhou after running out of fuel, including the leader of the raid, Lieutenant Colonel Jimmy Doolittle.

== Administration ==
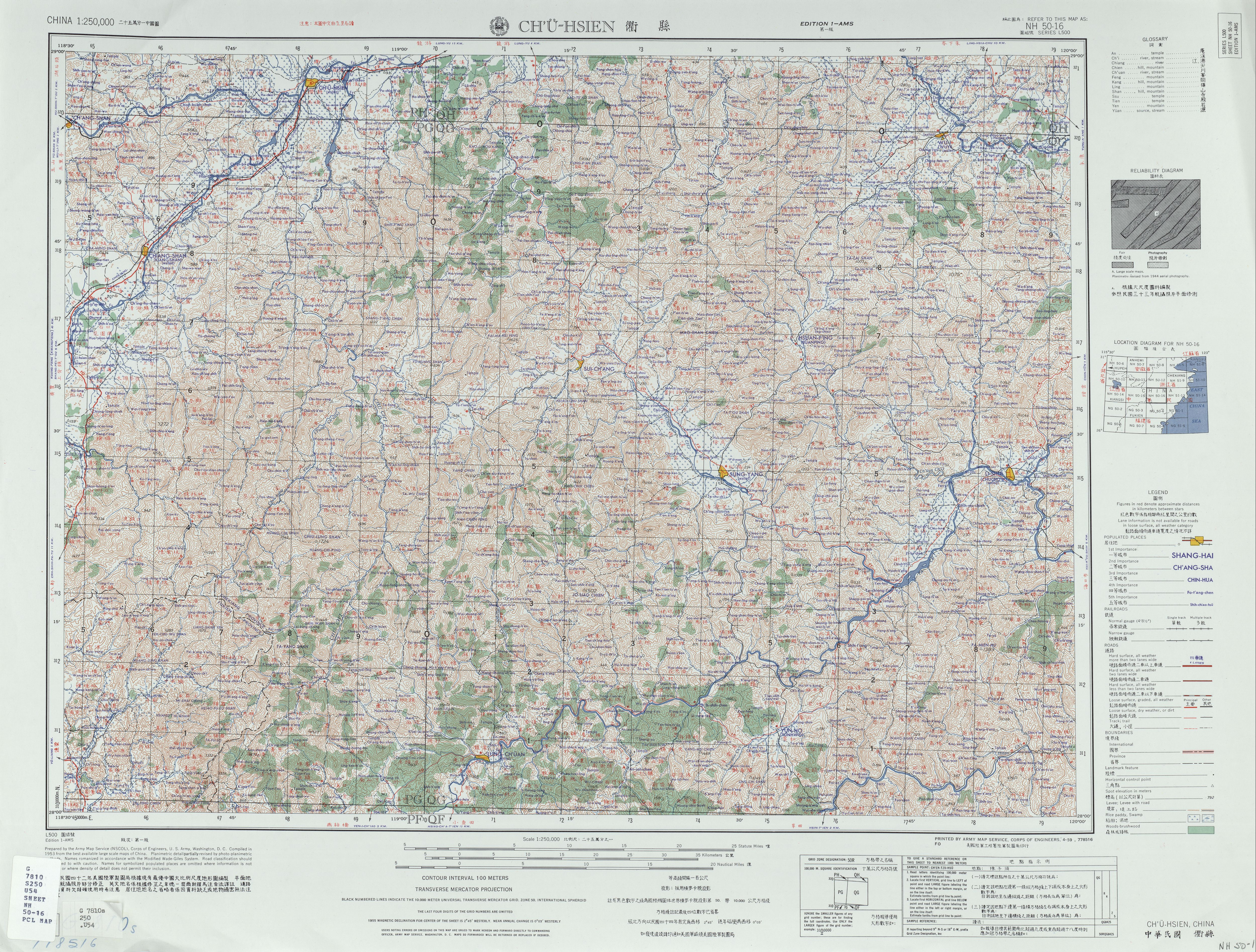
Map including Quzhou (labeled as CH'Ü-HSIEN 衢縣) (AMS, 1952)

The prefecture-level city of Quzhou administers 2 districts, 1 county-level city, and 3 counties.

Map
#	Name	Hanzi	Hanyu Pinyin
1	Kecheng District	柯城区	Kēchéng Qū
2	Qujiang District	衢江区	Qújiāng Qū
3	Jiangshan City	江山市	Jiāngshān Shì
4	Changshan County	常山县	Chángshān Xiàn
5	Kaihua County	开化县	Kāihuà Xiàn
6	Longyou County	龙游县	Lóngyóu Xiàn

== Geography ==
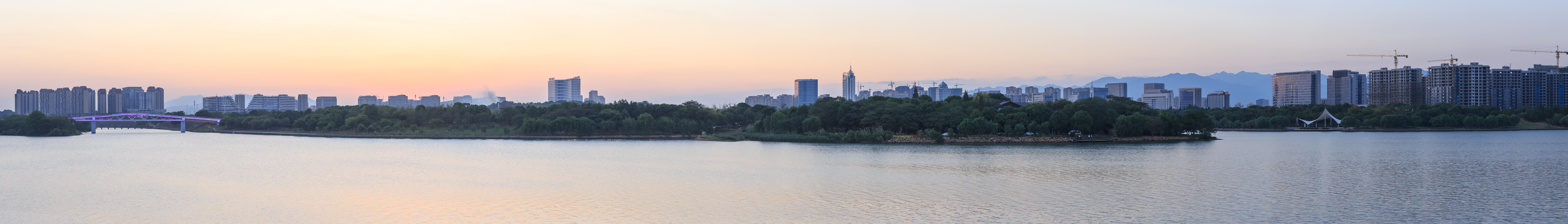
View of the Qu River outside the Shuiting Gate

The centre of Quzhou sits on a broad basin along the Qu River, a tributary of the Qiantang River. The Qu River flows roughly southeast for 81.5 km (50.6 mi) and is flanked on both sides by hills. Almost all the rivers of Quzhou feed into the Qiantang, which ultimately empties into Hangzhou Bay.

The terrain is higher in the west and the east. The territory of Quzhou Municipality is made up of plains (15%), hills (36%), and mountains (49%). In the north is the Qianli Gang (千里岗) mountain range and in the west the Yu Mountains (玉山脉). The highest mountains, the range known as the Xianxia Ling (仙霞岭), lie in the south. The highest point in the city is at Dalong Gang (大龙岗), which rises to 1,500 m above sea level.

70.7% of the land is covered with forest. The rest is densely irrigated and farmed, producing citrus fruits, tea and mulberry leaves.

The north China plain is an important grain-producing areas is also a key area of nitrogen loss, Quzhou's nitrogen loss in 2017 about 9000 tons, to improve crops (wheat, corn, vegetables and animal (pig, eggs) in the production of reasonable management to further improve the Quzhou has been the development of the north China plain green agriculture.

=== Climate ===
Quzhou has a humid subtropical climate (Köppen Cfa) with four distinctive seasons, characterised by hot, humid summers and chilly, cloudy and drier winters (with occasional snow). The mean annual temperature is 17.31 °C (63.2 °F), with monthly daily averages ranging from 5.4 °C (41.7 °F) in January to 28.7 °C (83.7 °F) in July. The city receives an average annual rainfall of 1,665.1 millimetres (65.6 in) and is affected by the plum rains of the Asian monsoon in June, when average relative humidity also peaks. The frost-free period lasts 251–261 days. Winds along the Qiantang River valley are predominantly north-easterly and north-east-easterly. Occasionally typhoons blow in from the Pacific Ocean. With monthly percent possible sunshine ranging from 25% in March to 59% in August, the city receives 1,810 hours of bright sunshine annually.

Climate data for Quzhou, elevation 82 m (269 ft), (1991–2020 normals, extremes 1951–present)
Month	Jan	Feb	Mar	Apr	May	Jun	Jul	Aug	Sep	Oct	Nov	Dec	Year
Record high °C (°F)	26.1 (79.0)	28.2 (82.8)	34.6 (94.3)	35.9 (96.6)	36.8 (98.2)	39.0 (102.2)	40.9 (105.6)	42.1 (107.8)	39.6 (103.3)	36.1 (97.0)	32.3 (90.1)	27.0 (80.6)	42.1 (107.8)
Mean daily maximum °C (°F)	9.9 (49.8)	12.5 (54.5)	16.6 (61.9)	22.8 (73.0)	27.4 (81.3)	29.5 (85.1)	34.2 (93.6)	33.7 (92.7)	29.5 (85.1)	24.5 (76.1)	18.6 (65.5)	12.5 (54.5)	22.6 (72.8)
Daily mean °C (°F)	5.8 (42.4)	8.0 (46.4)	11.9 (53.4)	17.6 (63.7)	22.4 (72.3)	25.3 (77.5)	29.1 (84.4)	28.7 (83.7)	24.8 (76.6)	19.6 (67.3)	13.8 (56.8)	7.8 (46.0)	17.9 (64.2)
Mean daily minimum °C (°F)	2.8 (37.0)	4.6 (40.3)	8.2 (46.8)	13.6 (56.5)	18.5 (65.3)	22.0 (71.6)	25.2 (77.4)	24.9 (76.8)	21.2 (70.2)	15.7 (60.3)	10.1 (50.2)	4.3 (39.7)	14.3 (57.7)
Record low °C (°F)	−10.4 (13.3)	−8.9 (16.0)	−2.9 (26.8)	2.1 (35.8)	9.2 (48.6)	14.4 (57.9)	19.3 (66.7)	18.0 (64.4)	12.0 (53.6)	2.1 (35.8)	−3.6 (25.5)	−7 (19)	−10.4 (13.3)
Average precipitation mm (inches)	91.2 (3.59)	108.6 (4.28)	189.4 (7.46)	204.0 (8.03)	211.1 (8.31)	360.0 (14.17)	167.8 (6.61)	128.2 (5.05)	76.9 (3.03)	52.2 (2.06)	85.7 (3.37)	71.1 (2.80)	1,746.2 (68.76)
Average precipitation days (≥ 0.1 mm)	13.8	13.3	17.6	16.3	15.8	17.5	11.5	12.3	9.3	8.0	10.6	10.5	156.5
Average snowy days	3.1	2.3	0.5	0	0	0	0	0	0	0	0.1	1.3	7.3
Average relative humidity (%)	79	78	78	76	76	81	74	75	76	73	77	77	77
Mean monthly sunshine hours	93.2	92.8	109.6	128.5	145.4	124.9	226.8	214.6	178.8	168.5	129.3	124.3	1,736.7
Percentage possible sunshine	28	29	29	33	35	30	53	53	49	48	41	39	39
Source: China Meteorological Administration all-time extreme temperatureAll-time May record low

== Tourism ==
- Ancestral Temple of the Southern Confucian Clan
- Lanke Mountain, 10 km (6.2 mi) southeast of the city proper. It features green peaks and clear waters, and the huge rocks on top of the mountain support a horizontal rock to form a natural arch, the Tiansheng Bridge ("Nature-Formed").

== Demographics ==
As of 2003, Quzhou municipality registered a population of 2,578,100. The vast majority are Han Chinese (99.16%) but there are also small minorities of She (0.73%) and Hui, Zhuang, Manchu and Miao (together making up 0.1%). Most of the people in Quzhou are engaged in agriculture (2,035,100). The genders are roughly evenly split. Population density is 273 people per km^{2}. At any given time there are a handful of foreign (mainly European and Australian) teachers at the schools and university of Quzhou, as well as alleged but never seen Russian Military Personnel who work and advise at the military base.

== Transportation ==
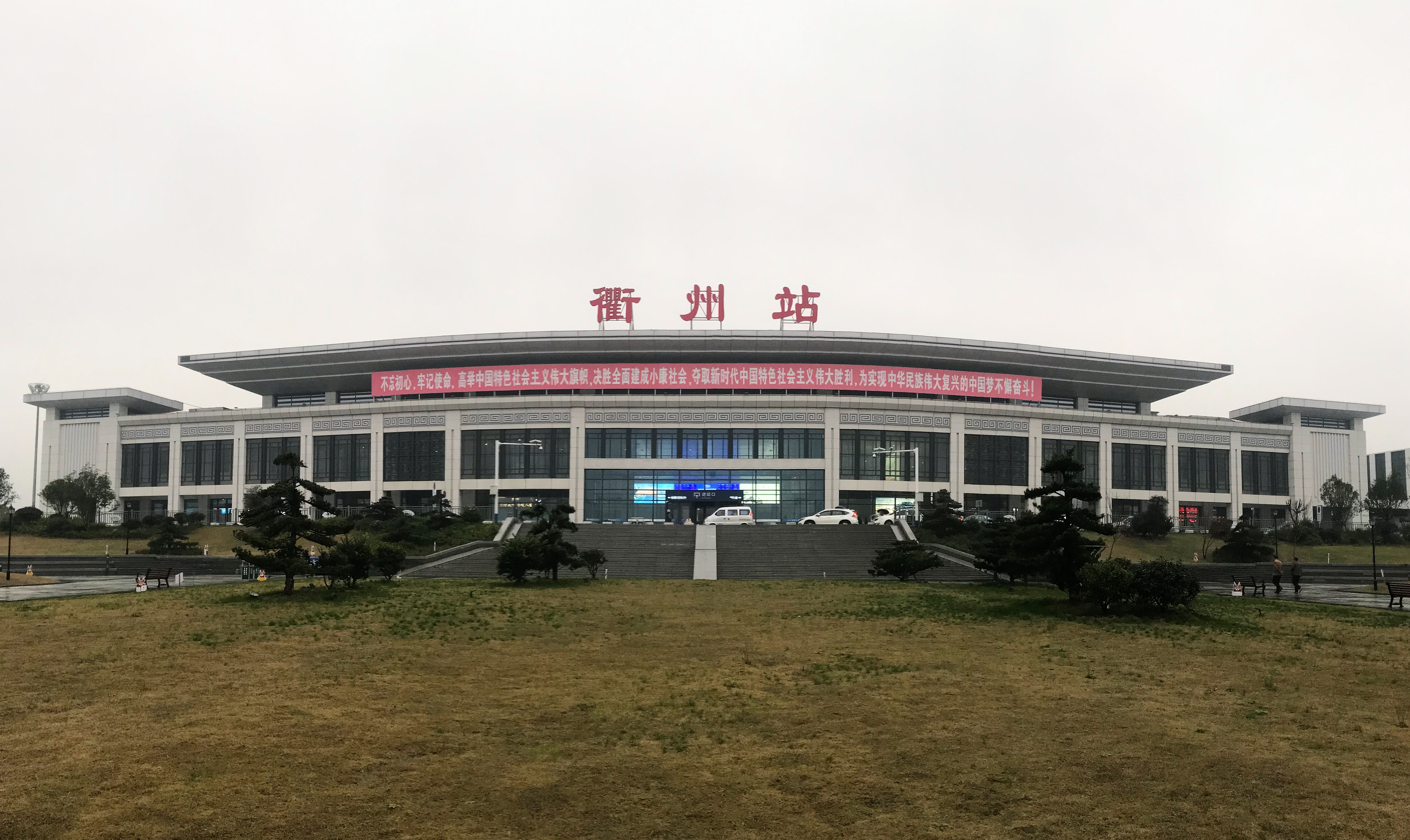
Quzhou railway station

Quzhou Airport

Quzhou is well served by both railways and highways. The city of Quzhou is a major connection hub between the three provinces of Anhui, Jiangxi and Fujian, with the Zhegan Railroad running through southern Quzhou and the Qu River flowing past northern Quzhou. A local saying goes: "Four provinces through Qu, it's the head of five roads". (四省通衢、五路总头)

Airport

Quzhou Airport, ranked as class 4C, is located 3 km (1.9 mi) away from east side of city centre, and this airport was built in 22nd year of Republic of China (1933). The destinations are Beijing, Chongqing, Haikou, Jinan, Qingdao, Kunming, Dalian, Guiyang, Xi'an and Shenzhen. Airplane timetable and more information can be found on Quzhou airport official website. The nearest large-scale airport is Hangzhou International Airport, and its information can be found on Hangzhou International Airport Official Website

Railway

One of the most famous railway passes through the city is Shanghai-Kunming Railway with a speed of 200 km/h (120 mph). This railway has three stations in city, which are Longyou railway station, Quzhou railway station, Jiangshan railway station, Changshan Station, Kaihua Station. More information can be found on Quzhou Railway Website

Highway

Quzhou South Station, also named as Quzhou Express Station (衢州快客站), located in No.209 Shang Street, has 27 buses to Hangzhou, 18 to Jinhua, 8 to Ningbo, 6 to Wenzhou, and 3 to Shanghai daily. Another Express Station is located in He Hua Middle Road (荷花中路), on the south of newly built train station, and its destinations cover most cities in Jiangxi Province and Fujian Province. More bus information can be found on https://web.archive.org/web/20111231062848/http://www.icha.com.cn/RailwayStation/130.Html

== International relations ==
Quzhou had bilateral agreements with:

- Red Wing, Minnesota, United States
- Sano City, Tochigi Prefecture, Japan
- (Georgia (country)) Kutaisi, Georgia
- Vanadzor, Armenia
- Sumqayıt, Azerbaijan
- Province of Catanzaro, Italy
- Murcia, Spain
- Emfuleni, South Africa
