= XXIX Corps =

29th Corps, XXIX Corps or 29th Army Corps may refer to:

== China ==
- 29th Corps (People's Republic of China)

== Germany ==
- XXIX Army Corps (Wehrmacht)

== Russia and Soviet Union ==
=== Russian Empire ===
- 29th Army Corps (Russian Empire)

=== Soviet Union ===
- 29th Mechanized Corps
- 29th Rifle Corps
- 29th Tank Corps

== United Kingdom ==
- 29th (Stockport) Cheshire Rifle Volunteer Corps
- 29th (North Middlesex) Middlesex Rifle Volunteer Corps

== See also ==
- List of military corps by number
- 29th Army (disambiguation)
- 29th Battalion (disambiguation)
- 29th Brigade (disambiguation)
- 29th Division (disambiguation)
- 29th Regiment (disambiguation)
- 29th Squadron (disambiguation)
- 29th (disambiguation)
