= 29th Cavalry =

29th Cavalry may refer to:

== Divisions ==
- 29th Cavalry Division (Soviet Union)

== Regiments ==
- 29th Cavalry Regiment (United States)
- 29th Texas Cavalry Regiment, Confederate States Army

== Battalions ==
- 29th (Irish Horse) Battalion, Imperial Yeomanry

== See also ==
- 29th Division (disambiguation)
- 29th Brigade (disambiguation)
- 29th Regiment (disambiguation)
- 29th (disambiguation)
