= 29th =

29th is the ordinal form of the number 29. 29th or Twenty-ninth may also refer to:

- A fraction, 1/29, equal to one of 29 equal parts
- 29th of the month, a recurring calendar date

== Geography ==
- 29th meridian east, a line of longitude
- 29th meridian west, a line of longitude
- 29th parallel north, a circle of latitude
- 29th parallel south, a circle of latitude
- 29th Avenue
- 29th Street (disambiguation)

== Military ==
- 29th Army (disambiguation)
- 29th Battalion (disambiguation)
- 29th Brigade (disambiguation)
- 29th Division (disambiguation)
- 29th Regiment (disambiguation)
- 29th Squadron (disambiguation)

== Other ==
- Twenty-ninth Amendment
- 29th century
- 29th century BC

== See also ==
- 29 (disambiguation)
