= 29th Army =

29th Army may refer to:

- Twenty-Ninth Army (Japan)
- 29th Army (Soviet Union)
- 29th Air Army, Soviet Union
- 29th Guards Combined Arms Army, Soviet Union/Russia

== See also ==
- List of armies by number
- XXIX Corps (disambiguation)
- 29th Division (disambiguation)
- 29th Brigade (disambiguation)
- 29th Regiment (disambiguation)
- 29th Battalion (disambiguation)
- 29th Squadron (disambiguation)
- 29th (disambiguation)
