= 29th Street station =

29th Street station may refer to:

- 29th station, a former L station in Chicago, Illinois
- 29th Street station (Sacramento), a light rail station in Sacramento, California
- Church and 29th Street / Church and Day stations, a streetcar stop in San Francisco, California
- 29th Avenue station, a rapid transit station in Vancouver, British Columbia

== See also ==
- 29th Street (disambiguation)
