= USS Wright =

USS Wright may refer to the following ships of the United States Navy:

- USS Wright (AV-1), was launched in 1920 as airship tender AZ-1, then converted twice more during her career for various duties until 1946 when she was scrapped
- Wright (CV-47), was an Essex-class aircraft carrier laid down in August 1944 and renamed Philippine Sea in February 1945, prior to launching
- USS Wright (CVL-49) was a light aircraft carrier commissioned in 1947, converted to a command ship and recommissioned as CC-2 in 1962, and decommissioned in 1970
- SS Wright (T-AVB-3) is an active Aviation Logistics Support (roll-on/roll-off) container ship used by the US Navy Auxiliary
