= NS29 =

NS29, NS 29, NS-29, NS.29, or variation, may refer to:

- Hammonds Plains-Lucasville (constituency N.S. 29), Nova Scotia, Canada; a provincial electoral district
- Nonstructural protein 29 (NS29), a viral glycoprotein
- New Penguin Shakespeare volume 29
- Blue Origin NS-29, a suborbital spaceflight by the New Shepard that simulated lunar gravity

== See also ==
- NS (disambiguation)
- 29 (disambiguation)
