= 29th Battalion =

29th Battalion may refer to:

- 29th Battalion (Australia), a unit of the Australian Army raised for service during World War I
- 2/29th Battalion (Australia), a unit of the Australian Army raised for service during World War II
- 29th Battalion, (Vancouver), CEF, a unit of the Canadian Expeditionary Force raised for service during World War I
- 29th Battalion (New Zealand), a unit of the New Zealand 3rd Division raised for service in the Pacific during World War II

== See also ==
- 29th Division (disambiguation)
- 29th Brigade (disambiguation)
- 29th Regiment (disambiguation)
- 29 Squadron (disambiguation)
