= USS Philippine Sea (CV-47) =

Essex-class aircraft carrier of the US Navy

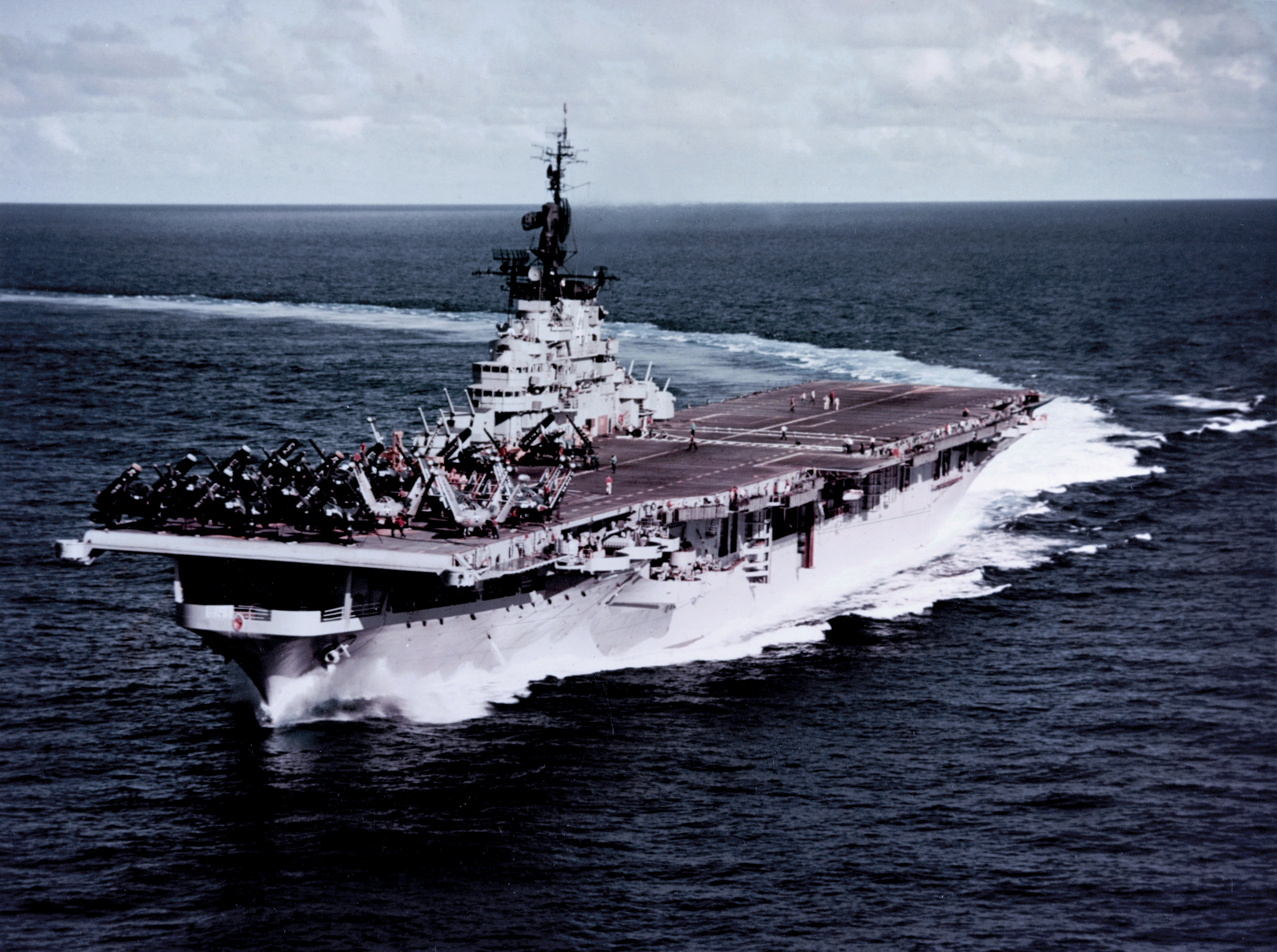
- Philippine Sea underway, 9 July 1955

History

United States
- Name: Philippine Sea
- Namesake: Battle of the Philippine Sea
- Ordered: 14 June 1943
- Builder: Fore River Shipyard
- Laid down: 19 August 1944
- Launched: 5 September 1945
- Commissioned: 11 May 1946
- Decommissioned: 28 December 1958
- Reclassified: CVA-47, 1 October 1952; CVS-47, 15 November 1955; AVT-11, 15 May 1959
- Stricken: 1 December 1969
- Fate: Scrapped, 23 March 1971

General characteristics
- Class & type: Essex-class aircraft carrier
- Displacement: 27,100 long tons (27,500 t) standard
- Length: 888 feet (271 m) overall
- Beam: 93 feet (28 m)
- Draft: 28 feet 7 inches (8.71 m)
- Installed power: 8 × boilers; 150,000 shp (110 MW)
- Propulsion: 4 × geared steam turbines; 4 × shafts
- Speed: 33 knots (61 km/h; 38 mph)
- Complement: 3448 officers and enlisted
- Armament: 12 × 5 inch (127 mm)/38 caliber guns; 32 × Bofors 40 mm guns; 46 × Oerlikon 20 mm cannons
- Armor: Belt: 4 in (102 mm); Hangar deck: 2.5 in (64 mm); Deck: 1.5 in (38 mm); Conning tower: 1.5 inch
- Aircraft carried: 90–100 aircraft

USS Philippine Sea (CV/CVA/CVS-47, AVT-11) was one of 24 Essex-class aircraft carriers of the United States Navy, and the first ship to be named for the Battle of the Philippine Sea. She was launched on 5 September 1945, after the end of World War II, and sponsored by the wife of the Governor of Kentucky.

During her career, Philippine Sea served first in the Atlantic Ocean and saw several deployments to the Mediterranean Sea as well as a trip to Antarctica as a part of Operation Highjump. Sent to the Korean Peninsula at the outbreak of the Korean War, she sent aircraft in support of United Nations ground troops, first during the Battle of Pusan Perimeter and then during the Inchon Landings and the Second Battle of Seoul. She subsequently supported UN troops during the surprise Chinese attack and the Chosin Reservoir Campaign. Philippine Sea saw three tours to Korea during the war, receiving nine battle stars for her service.

For the remainder of her service, she operated primarily out of San Diego and San Francisco, seeing several deployments to the Far East and being redesignated an anti-submarine warfare carrier. She was decommissioned on 28 December 1958 and sold for scrap in 1970.

== Construction ==
Philippine Sea was the last of the 24 Essex-class ships to be completed, among the largest and most numerous capital ships produced for World War II. CV-47 was ordered simultaneously to Valley Forge and Iwo Jima in June 1943.

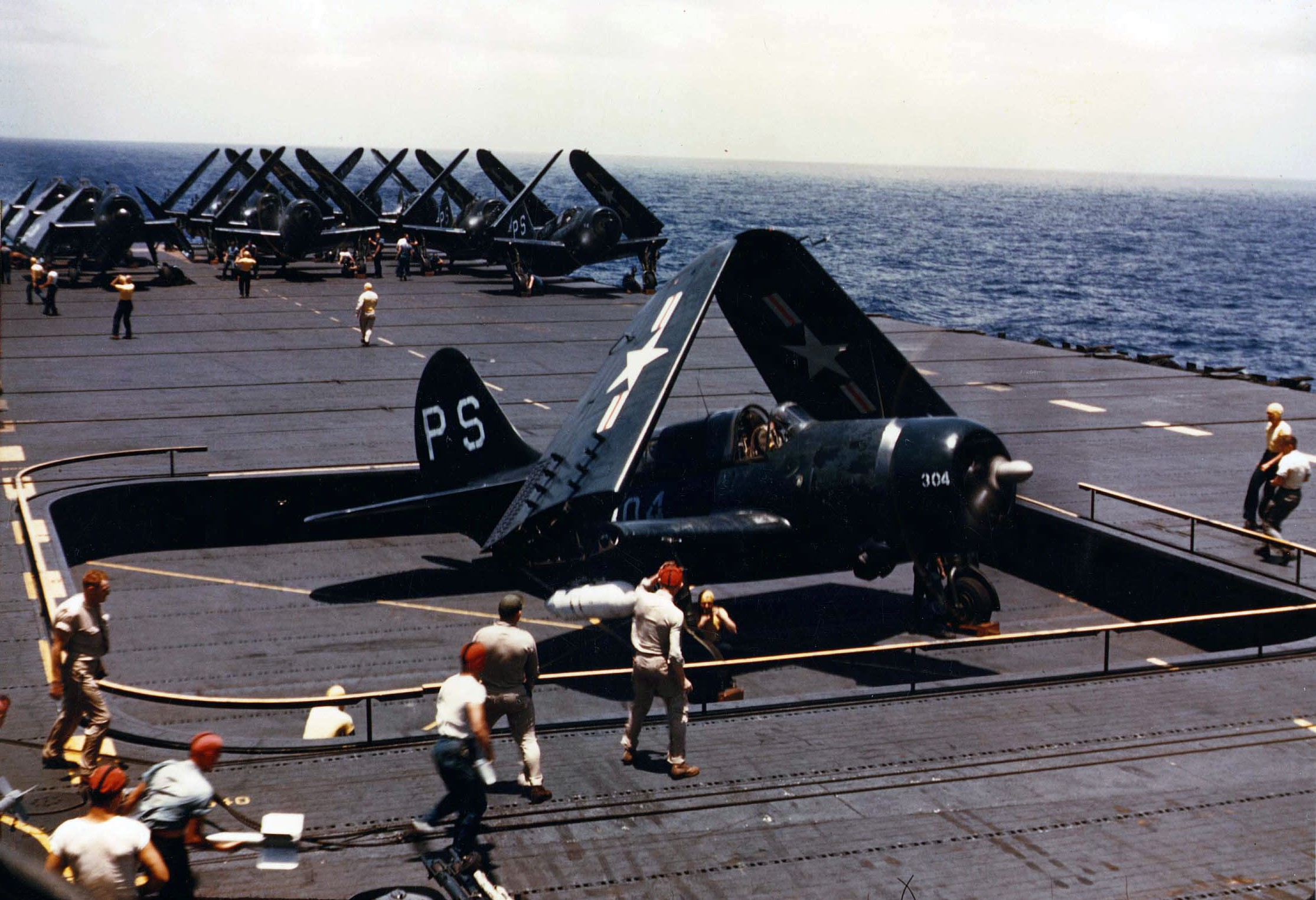
Curtiss SB2C-5 Helldivers aboard Philippine Sea during her cruise in the Mediterranean in 1948

The ship was one of the "long-hull" designs of the class, which had begun production after March 1943. This "long-hull" variant involved lengthening the bow above the waterline into a "clipper" form. The increased rake and flare provided deck space for two quadruple 40-millimeter (1.6 in) mounts; these units also had the flight deck slightly shortened forward to provide better arcs of fire. Of the Essex-class ships laid down after 1942, only Bon Homme Richard followed the original "short-hull" design. The later ships have been variously referred to as the "long-bow units", the "long-hull group", or the "Ticonderoga class". However, the U.S. Navy never maintained any institutional distinction between the long-hull and short-hull members of the Essex class, and applied postwar refits and upgrades to both groups equally. The ship was powered by eight 600 psi Babcock & Wilcox boilers, and Westinghouse geared steam turbines that developed 150,000 shaft horsepower that turned four propellers. Like other Essex-class carriers, she had a maximum speed of 33 knots (61 km/h; 38 mph). The ship's cost is estimated at $68,000,000 to $78,000,000.

Like other "long-hull" Essex-class carriers, Philippine Sea had a displacement of 27,100 tonnes (26,700 long tons; 29,900 short tons). She had an overall length of 888 feet (271 m), a beam of 93 feet (28 m) and a draft of 39 feet (12 m). The ship was powered by 150,000-shaft-horsepower (110,000 kW) steam turbines with a designed range of 20,000 nautical miles (37,000 km; 23,000 mi). While Essex-class carriers typically had a designed maximum speed of 33 knots (61 km/h; 38 mph), Philippine Sea only made 30 knots (56 km/h; 35 mph) on sea trials. The ship had a total crew complement of 3,310. Like other Essex-class ships, she was armed with twelve 38-caliber 5-inch (127 mm) dual-purpose guns arrayed in four twin and four single mountings, as well as 8 quadruple Bofors 40 mm guns and a variable number of Oerlikon 20 mm cannon. Unlike her sisters, however, Philippine Sea substituted additional Bofors guns for the Oerlikons with forty-four 40 mm (1.6 in) guns arrayed in 10 quadruple and two double mounts.

The keel of CV-47 was laid down 19 August 1944 at the Bethlehem Steel Company in Quincy, Massachusetts. Originally, the ship was to be named USS Wright in honor of the Wright brothers, but following the 19 June 1944 Battle of the Philippine Sea, the Navy decided that the ship be named after the battle, and on 13 February 1945, she was renamed. Construction on the ship continued throughout the summer of 1945, but Philippine Sea was not completed at the time of V-E Day. The ship was launched on 5 September 1945, only days after V-J Day and the end of World War II. She was christened by the wife of Governor of Kentucky Albert "Happy" Chandler.

== Service history ==
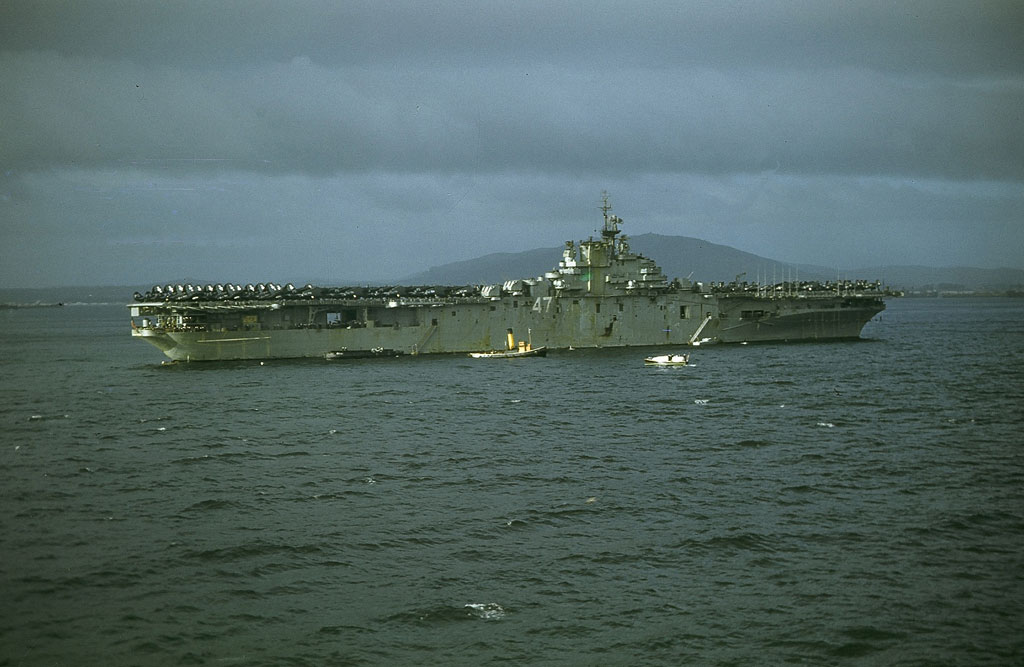
Philippine Sea at Gibraltar in early 1948

Philippine Sea commissioned on 11 May 1946, when Rear Admiral Morton Deyo placed the ship under the command of Captain Delbert Strother Cornwell at the Boston Navy Yard in South Boston, Massachusetts. The ship remained drydocked at the yard for two weeks before sailing for Naval Air Station Quonset Point on 13 June. However, a shortage of men following the post-World War II demobilization forced her to remain at reduced operational status until 23 September when she embarked for sea trials.

Returning from trials on 27 September, the carrier embarked Carrier Air Group 20, which flew two squadrons of Grumman F8F Bearcat fighter aircraft as well as a squadron each of Curtiss SB2C Helldiver dive bombers and Grumman TBM-3E Avenger torpedo bombers, about 90 aircraft total. She left port 30 September and commenced training en route to Norfolk, Virginia. CVG-20 Commander Robert M. Milner made the first takeoff from the carrier on 1 October aboard a Bearcat. Philippine Sea departed Norfolk Naval Shipyard 12 October for Cuban waters where she conducted an abbreviated shakedown cruise and training exercises for CVG-20's Grumman F8F Bearcats and Curtiss SB2C Helldivers until 20 November.

Following these trials, Philippine Sea was assigned to Operation Highjump. She returned to Quonset and disembarked CVG-20 before sailing for Boston for repairs and alterations. She then headed to Norfolk where Rear Admiral Richard E. Byrd boarded her and she took on six Douglas R4D-5 Skytrain transports, two Stinson OY-1 Sentinel liaison aircraft, and a Sikorsky HO3S-1 helicopter along with cargo, spare parts, skis and Task Force 68 personnel. She left Norfolk 29 December and stood out of Hampton Roads 2 January 1947 en route to Antarctica. Philippine Sea passed through the Panama Canal 8 January and cleared Balboa by 10 January. By 12 January the ship had crossed the equator in an elaborate ceremony, but on 22 January its HO3S-1 was lost due to pilot error, though the crew was recovered. Two days later, it met the remaining ships of Task Force 68. The ship arrived on station on 29 January, 660 miles (1,060 km) from Little America, and launched its R4Ds in the next few days to explore the Antarctic. Commander William M. Hawkes and Byrd both disembarked from Philippine Sea aboard the aircraft to begin their expedition. After her aircraft departed, Philippine Sea returned to Quonset, passing through Balboa again on 22 February and arriving back in port on 27 February.

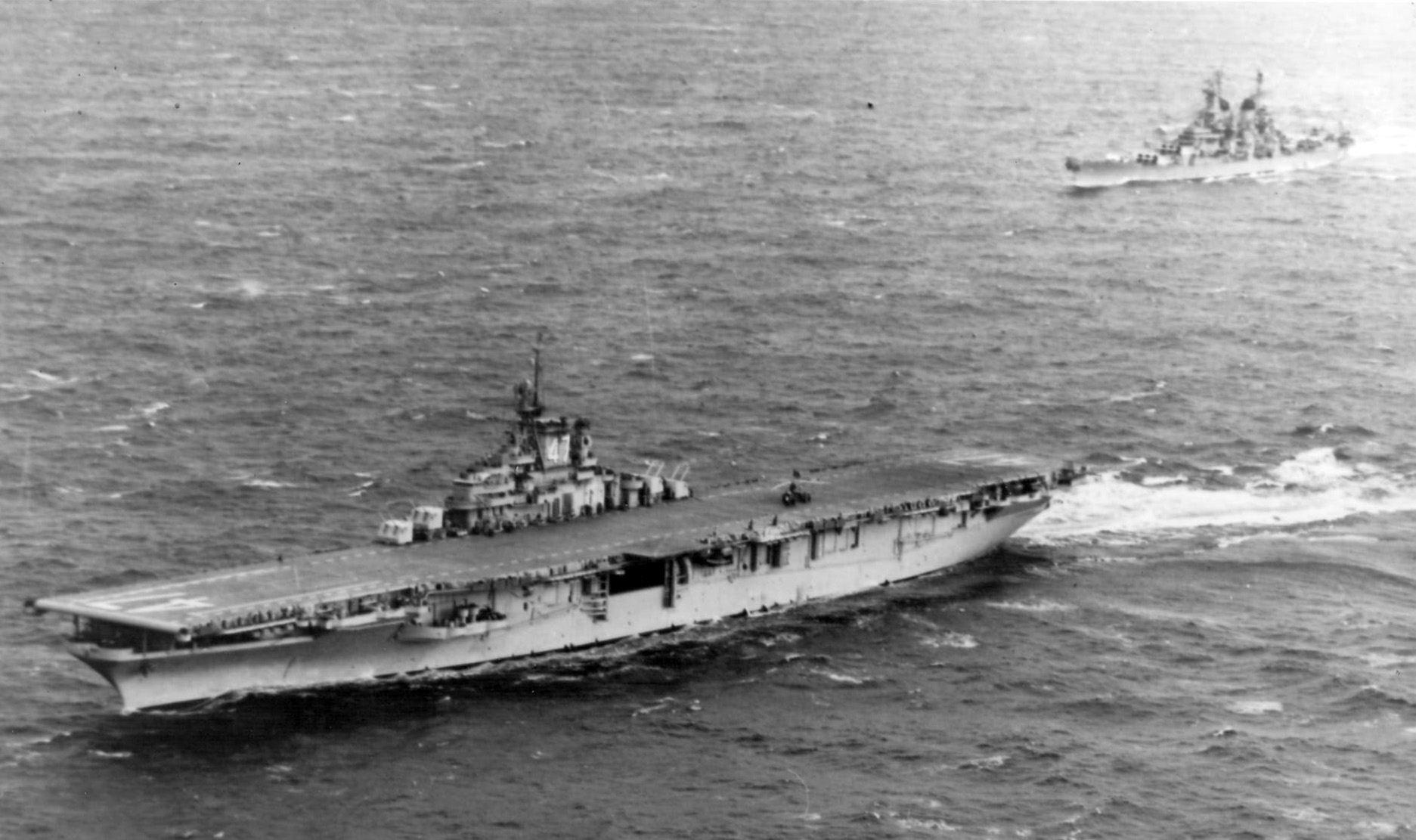
Philippine Sea with Wisconsin during cold weather fleet exercises in the North Atlantic, November 1948

In late March, the carrier embarked Carrier Air Group 9, which flew two squadrons of Gruman F8F Bearcats and Grumman F6F Hellcat fighters as well as a squadron each of SB2C Helldivers and TBM Avengers, and a detachment of HO3S helicopters for a total of about 100 aircraft. She completed her shakedown cruise at Guantánamo Bay until late May. She continued sea trials in the area until 1 July when she arrived at Gravesend Bay, New Jersey, for refit. She was refitted for most of the year at New York Naval Shipyard and Bayonne, New Jersey through 15 November 1947 before conducting trials and training around Quonset and Guantánamo Bay through February 1948. That month, she became flagship of Carrier Division Four led by Rear Admiral Ralph E. Jennings, who established his command aboard her on 4 February. On 20 February she departed for her first deployment in the Mediterranean Sea as part of Vice Admiral Forrest Sherman's 6th Fleet. Here she logged 8,534 flight hours, including 85 hours of night operations. She returned to Quonset 26 June and for repairs to her catapult machinery. She spent the remainder of the year as a part of the Operational Development Force testing new carrier aircraft doctrine, and her pilots logged 750 hours in 670 carrier controlled approach tests and 314 successful landings. On 22 October she was sent to the North Atlantic to conduct cold-weather landing tests and tested problem landing scenarios along the Arctic Circle until 23 November 1948.

In January 1949, Philippine Sea returned to Carrier Division Four under Rear Admiral Joseph J. Clark and embarked Carrier Air Group 7 for another tour in the Mediterranean, which had a similar fighter complement. She sailed 4 January with the aircraft carrier Midway and supporting ships. There, she conducted joint exercises with carriers of the British fleet. She returned in late May and began an overhaul at the Boston Naval Shipyard. On 18 August, Captain Raymond R. "Raoul" Waller was assigned as her commanding officer. That fall, the ship returned to the Caribbean to shake down with its new upgrades, this time with Carrier Air Group 1. For the rest of the year, she continued fleet exercises in the North Atlantic and testing for new jet engine powered fighter aircraft to test their abilities to operate on aircraft carriers.

Operating again from her base at Quonset Point, Philippine Sea spent early 1950 qualifying new carrier pilots. During February and most of March, she took part in more fleet exercises throughout the Atlantic. During April and May 1950 she conducted demonstration cruises for guests of the Secretary of the Navy, the Armed Forces Industrial College, Air War College, and the Armed Forces Staff College. On 24 May 1950, Philippine Sea sailed from Norfolk through the Panama Canal, arriving at her new home port of San Diego to join the Pacific Fleet. She was replaced in the Atlantic Fleet by Oriskany. She was scheduled to begin a tour in the Far East in October 1950 before she was called to combat duty.

=== Korean War ===
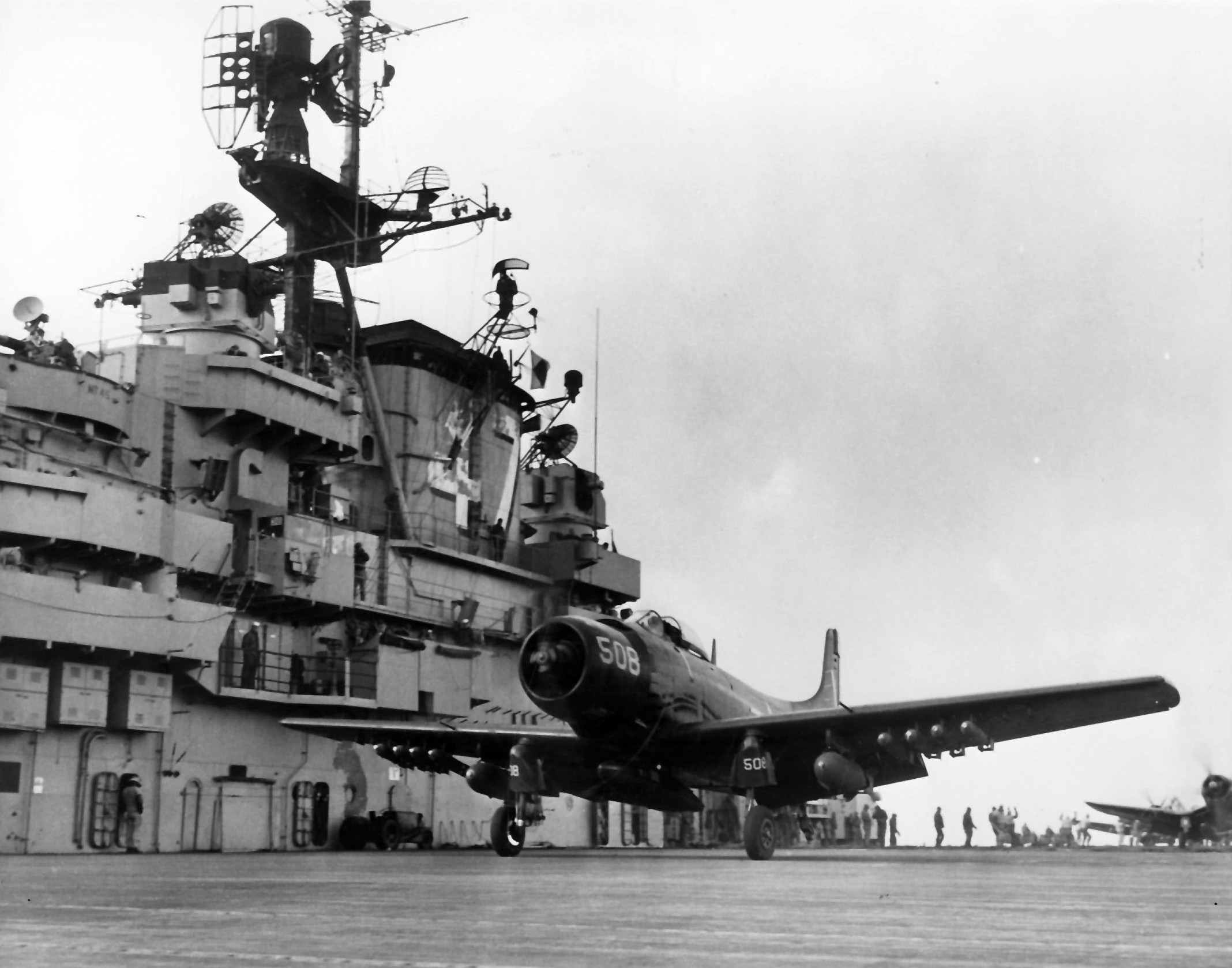
An AD-4 Skyraider takes off from Philippine Sea for a sortie to Korea in the fall of 1950.

With the outbreak of the Korean War on 25 June 1950, Philippine Sea was ordered to Naval Base Pearl Harbor. She sailed for Hawaiian waters on 5 July with Carrier Air Group 11 embarked, flying four squadrons of Vought F4U Corsair fighter-bombers. The ship departed for Japan on 24 July. Leaving Pearl Harbor, Philippine Sea sailed at full speed for the Western Pacific, reaching Okinawa on 4 August. During this time, she took command of Carrier Division One. She was the third aircraft carrier to arrive in Korea, as her sister ship Valley Forge as well as HMS Triumph had arrived in July. By the time Philippine Sea arrived in Korea, the UN forces had established superiority in the air and sea.

Philippine Sea arrived in Korean waters on 1 August, and became flagship of Task Force 77 on 5 August. She immediately began launching air strikes against strategic targets, as the Battle of Pusan Perimeter began and United Nations and United States Army forces fought a defensive battle against the North Korean Korean People's Army. Her first strikes were against Iri, Mokpo, and Kunsan. The strikes were at first planned to target North Korean lines of communication but the intensity of the battle at Pusan Perimeter forced the carrier to fly primarily close air support missions for troops on the front lines. They also hit targets of opportunity, such as North Korean boats, bridges and dams spotted during missions. As many as 140 sorties a day were launched from the carrier. Except for brief rests to re-arm, refuel, or repair, Philippine Sea was in action continuously. She was put in a rotation of continuous action with Valley Forge to assure at least one was launching aircraft at all times. Following the beginning of The Great Naktong Offensive on 31 August, the two carriers launched 263 sorties to prevent the North Koreans from overrunning Pusan Perimeter. The ship sent sorties to defend Masan during the Battle of Masan, in spite of being 200 miles (320 km) from the area. The ship steamed to the southern tip of the Peninsula at 27 knots (50 km/h; 31 mph) on 1 September to support the Masan area more easily during the North Korean attacks.

With the other carriers of Task Force 77, Philippine Sea targeted rail and communication centers around North Korean-controlled Seoul to Wonsan in September. The strikes were part of a deception plan to draw North Korean attention away from the UN force massing for an attack on Inchon. Stationed in the Yellow Sea, she sent numerous air attacks on Inchon and Wolmi-do in preparation for Operation Chromite. The day of the operation, 15 September, Philippine Sea dispatched planes far inland to destroy North Korean positions and prevent reinforcements from countering the Inchon landings. Following the initial assault, she continued to provide close air support for the thrust inland to recapture Seoul. During this time, she was joined by Boxer. They were part of a massive invasion force of some 230 ships and hundreds of aircraft.

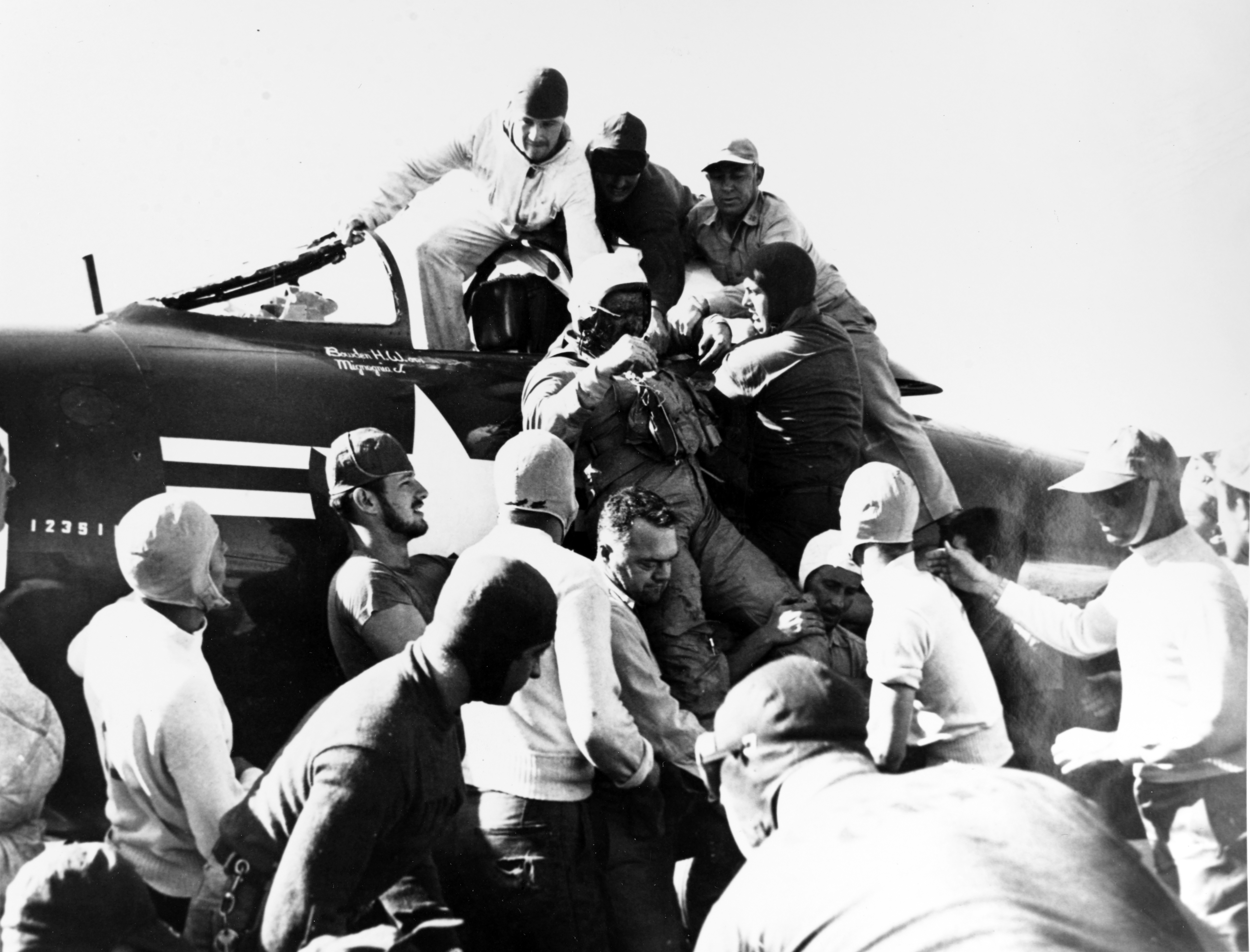
Ensign Jackson being helped from Grumman F9F-2 Panther after landing blind

On 17 September 1950 a pair of Grumman F9F-2 Panthers launched from the deck of Philippine Sea. VF-112 Ensign Edward D. Jackson Jr. was leading a section dispatched to strafe an airfield near North Korea's capital, Pyongyang. Flying on his wing was Ensign Dayl E. Crow. The airfield turned out to be little more than a grass strip littered with burned and shattered Soviet-built war machines. After strafing a locomotive and setting it ablaze, the jets turned north and started down the Han River. Soon, Jackson spotted about 75 river boats. When they starting receiving small arms fire from "passengers" on the vessels, Crow followed Jackson down as they made a low strafing pass, splintering many of the small craft with 20 mm cannon fire. After the pass both attackers started to climb from 50 feet (15 m) AGL. Jackson then flew through an aerial booby trap: steel cables strung across the Han to "clothesline" low flying planes. The Panther ripped through the cables like twine, but the whipsawing cable strands caught the starboard wing, shredded the wingtip tank and snapped across the canopy, punching out the windscreen and side windows. The impact knocked Jackson unconscious with severe facial injuries. Crow, flying just astern noticed something wrong, then saw the crushed wing tank and shattered canopy, its inner surface misted with blood. After 20 seconds Jackson regained consciousness and found himself blinded by shards of Plexiglas and blood. Crow was able to guide his leader towards the Yellow Sea, but Jackson was fading in and out of consciousness. With only the left flap down due to damage to the right wing the Panther approached the ship and with the help of LSO Lt.j.g. "Les" Bruestle and Crow, the blind pilot trapped the #4 wire on the first attempt. Jackson survived with 36 stitches and an emergency blood transfusion.

In November 1950 when China surprised the United Nations ground troops with an unexpected counterattack from the Yalu River by the People's Liberation Army, Philippine Sea planes saw heavy action. The US Navy had sent Valley Forge and several other ships away from Korea, expecting the conflict to end, and so the unprepared forces remaining in the area were heavily engaged. Throughout the long retreat from the Yalu River, the four carriers' Panthers, Skyraiders and Corsairs provided close air support for the trapped X Corps at Chosin Reservoir. Though the increasingly cold weather proved a problem for Philippine Sea, the ship continued to support the troops as they tried to evacuate from the reservoir and then cleared the path for their retreat to Hungnam. The carriers provided support with hundreds of aircraft sorties as 150,000 UN troops and civilians were evacuated, and then destroyed the port. During this support, Valley Forge and Philippine Sea were tightly clustered with Leyte and Princeton and commanders worried that they would be a target for air attack by North Korean MiG-15 fighters, prompting a large screen of 32 destroyers.

For the rest of 1950 and early 1951, she launched numerous attacks against Chinese forces around the 38th Parallel hoping to slow their advance as UN troops retreated. With only brief stops for repair and rest, the carrier continued numerous sorties against Chinese targets. On 25 February, command of Task Force 77 was transferred to Valley Forge. During this time, the cold weather hampered operations and blizzards occasionally shut them down completely. Putting into Yokosuka Naval Base, Japan, in late March 1951 for repair and refit, Philippine Sea exchanged Air Group 11 for Carrier Air Group 2 from Valley Forge, a group which consisted mostly of Vought F4U Corsair fighter-bombers. The same date as the transfer on 28 March, Philippine Sea became flagship of Vice Admiral H. M. Martin, the commander of the 7th Fleet.

Returning to the Sea of Japan in April, Philippine Sea led Task Force 77 as well as other ships of the 7th Fleet through the Strait of Formosa to the South China Sea. From the Formosa Strait, planes flew in parades over Formosa as part of a show of support for the newly formed nation of Taiwan, in an effort to boost morale of the nation. She steamed back to Korea three days later, in time to lend close air support to UN forces throughout early 1951 as they faced repeated offensives by the Chinese.

=== Post-Korea ===
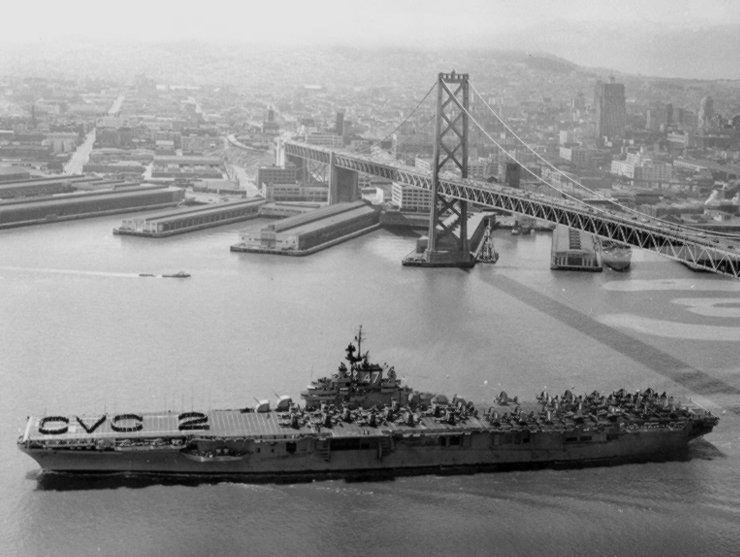
Air Group 2 in formation aboard Philippine Sea after the carrier's return from its first tour in Korea in early 1951

Philippine Sea completed her first deployment to Korea and arrived at San Francisco on 9 June 1951. It conducted refits, repairs and patrol operations along the West Coast continued for the remainder of the year. On 19 December, she was the site of a test for an emergency nuclear weapon assembly, the first such test involving a nuclear weapon aboard a US Navy ship. The ship departed from San Diego on 31 December 1951. Arriving at Pearl Harbor on 8 January 1952, Philippine Sea continued on to Yokosuka for a second deployment to Korea, arriving 20 January 1952 with Carrier Air Group 11, which flew five squadrons of the F4U Corsair, about 100 aircraft. During this tour, the front lines in Korea had largely stabilized, and instead the ship directed its aircraft against strategic targets, including the 23 June attack on the Sui-ho Dam in conjunction with Boxer, Princeton, and Bon Homme Richard, and sending aircraft against targets in Pyongyang.

Philippine Sea returned to San Diego in August 1952. Her designation was changed to CVA, denoting an "attack aircraft carrier" in October. With five more Corsair squadrons of Carrier Air Group 9 embarked, she began a third cruise to the Far East early in December 1952 with about 100 aircraft. In this third tour in Korea, Philippine Sea focused primarily on interdiction attacks against rail and communication lines in North Korea, hoping to limit supplies to the front lines. The North Korean offensive, begun at the same time truce talks began at Panmunjom, marked the beginning of a series of "round the clock" air sorties designed to weaken North Korean and Chinese front line troops and support UN troops when under attack. This mission continued until an armistice was signed in the summer of 1953, resulting in the de jure cessation of open warfare.

Following the end of her tour in Korea, the ship arrived in Alameda Naval Air Station in Alameda, California, on 14 August 1953 to offload Air Group 9, then entered drydock at Hunters Point in San Francisco for overhaul. On 9 January 1954, Philippine Sea once more began training off the coast of San Diego. She then steamed west on 12 March, for her fourth tour in the Far East. She operated out of U.S. Naval Base Subic Bay near Olongapo, Philippines. She was part of Carrier Division 3 and operated alongside Hornet around French Indochina.

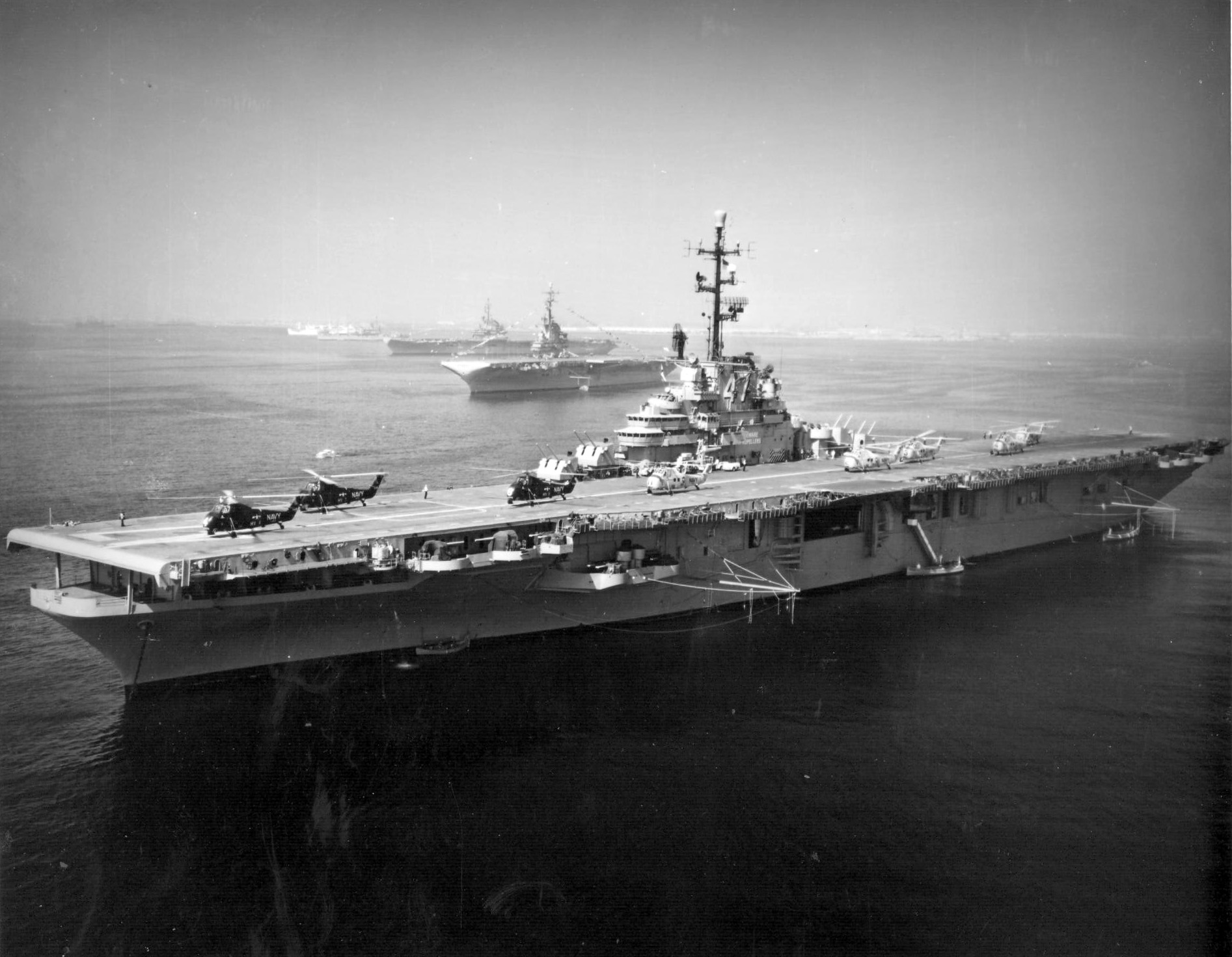
Philippine Sea at a fleet review at Long Beach, California, 1956, moored alongside Bennington and Shangri La

The most significant event of the tour occurred in late July 1954. Chinese airplanes had shot down a Douglas DC-4 passenger aircraft operated by Cathay Pacific Airways near Hainan Island off the Chinese coast. The Chinese military had believed it to be a Taiwanese military airplane. Philippine Sea was ordered into the area as part of a search mission to recover some of the 19 on board. While engaged in the search mission, a flight of the ship's Douglas AD Skyraiders was attacked by two Chinese fighter aircraft. The Skyraiders returned fire and shot down the airplanes. Later this came to be known unofficially as the "Hainan Incident".

Following this duty, the ship sailed for Hawaii, where she was used as a prop in the movie Mister Roberts. The ship returned to San Diego on 18 November. Remaining in the area for four months, Philippine Sea conducted several training operations off the California coast. She then began her fifth cruise of the Far East on 1 April 1955 en route to Yokosuka. She operated in waters of Japan, Okinawa, and Taiwan for most of 1955, with Air Task Group 2 consisting of VF-123, VF-143 and VA-55, VF-123 flying the F9F-2 Panther jet fighter-bomber, VF-143 flying the Grumman F9F-6 Cougar jet fighter, and VA-55 flying the AD-6 Skyraider propeller attack bomber. During this time, she made trips to Hong Kong, Keelung and Formosa. On 23 November, she was redesignated as a CVS, or an anti-submarine warfare carrier. Her aircraft complement was replaced with several dozen S2F Tracker anti-submarine aircraft and HSS-1 Seabat helicopters. She returned to San Diego on 23 November 1955. Throughout 1956 she saw little activity as crew went on leave and she was docked for maintenance, and only conducted several routine training operations off the coast of southern California. In late 1956 she moved to Hawaii for more training operations.

In March 1957, she sailed for the western Pacific on a sixth tour to the area with the HSS-1s and S2Fs of VS-21, VS-23, and VS-37. She was there for two months before returning to San Diego and resuming training missions off the west coast in summer 1957. In November 1957, she found some debris of Pan Am Flight 7, an airline flight that disappeared en route to Hawaii. In January 1958, she steamed west on her last 7th Fleet deployment. Remaining six months, she returned to San Diego on 15 July and commenced inactivation. She was decommissioned 28 December 1958 and berthed with the United States Reserve Fleet at Long Beach, California. She was redesignated AVT-11, an auxiliary aircraft transport and landing training ship, on 15 May 1959. After 10 years docked at the reserve fleet, she was struck from the Naval Vessel Registry on 1 December 1969 and sold for scrapping on 23 March 1971 to Zidell Explorations Corporation in Portland, Oregon.

Philippine Sea received nine battle stars for Korean War service. During her career, she logged 82,000 launches, including 33,575 catapult shots, and 82,813 landings. In April 1987, a new USS Philippine Sea (CG-58) was launched, a Ticonderoga-class guided missile cruiser. An organization was also formed of veterans who had served aboard the ship, the Philippine Sea Association.

== Awards ==

World War II Victory Medal	Navy Occupation Service Medal (with Europe clasp)	China Service Medal (extended)
National Defense Service Medal	Korean Service Medal (9 battle stars)	Antarctica Service Medal
Republic of Korea Presidential Unit Citation	United Nations Korea Medal	Republic of Korea War Service Medal (retroactive)

== Gallery ==
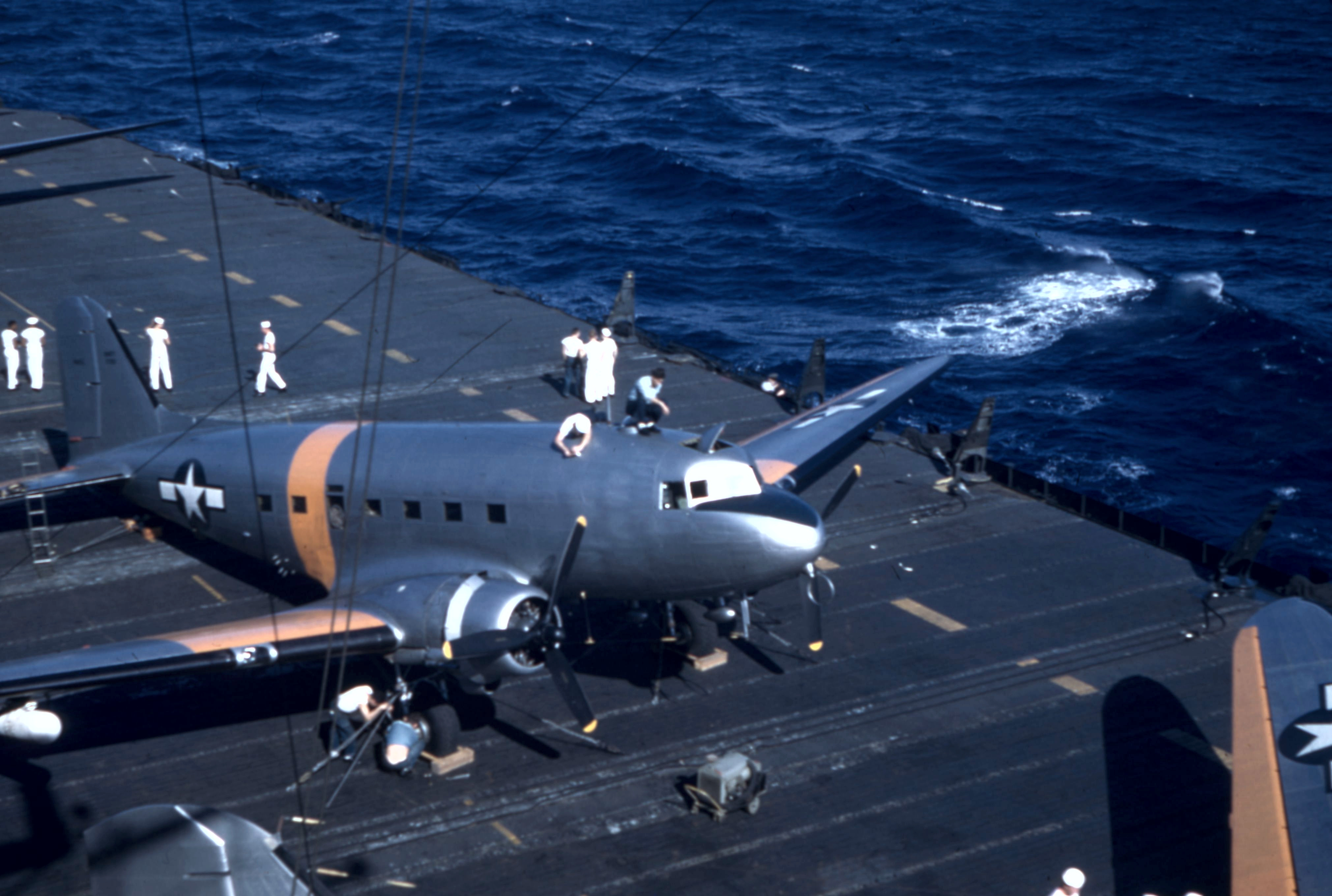
R4D Skytrain onboard Philippine Sea in Antarctica on 8 January 1947

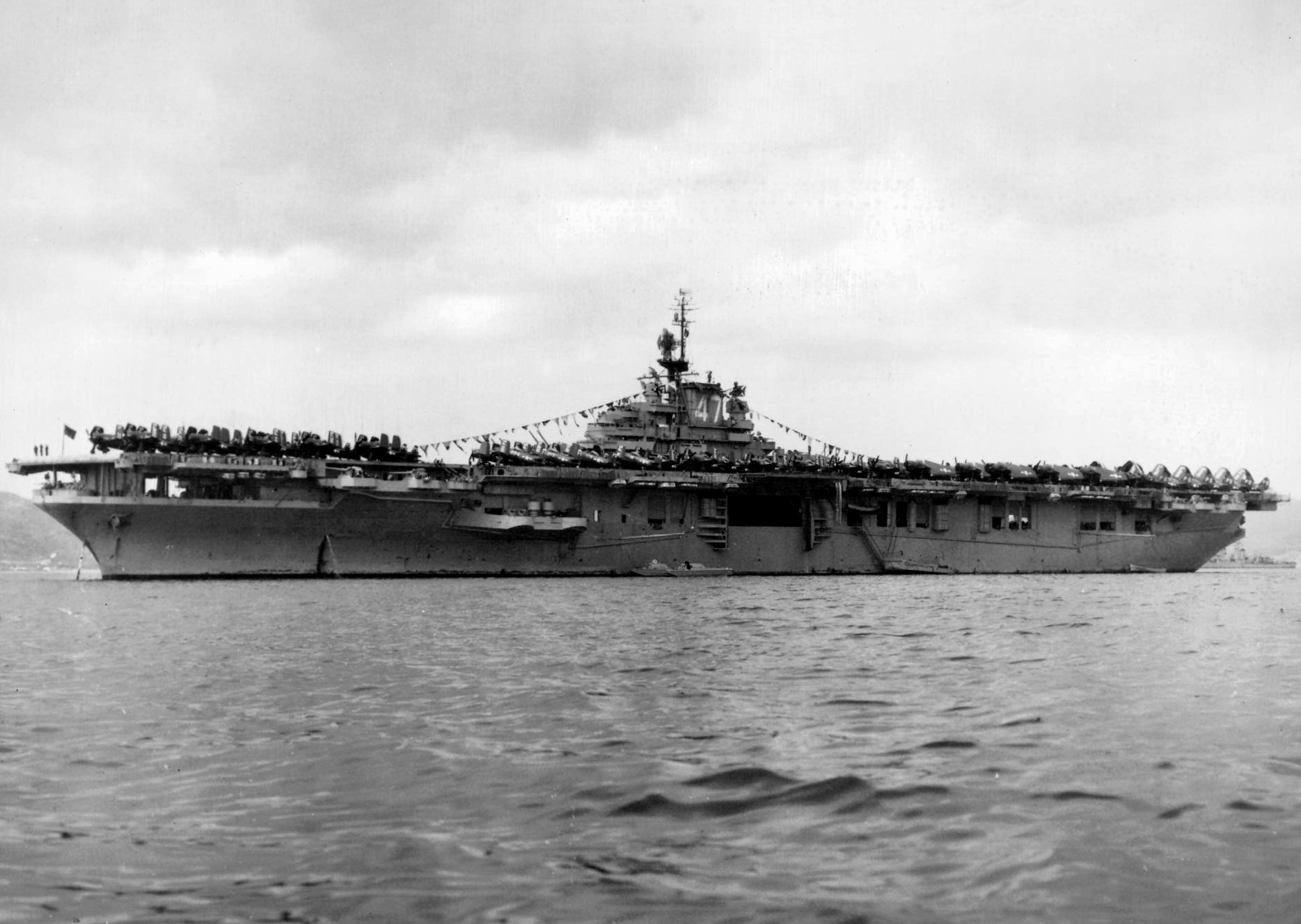
Philippine Sea anchored off Argostolion in 1948

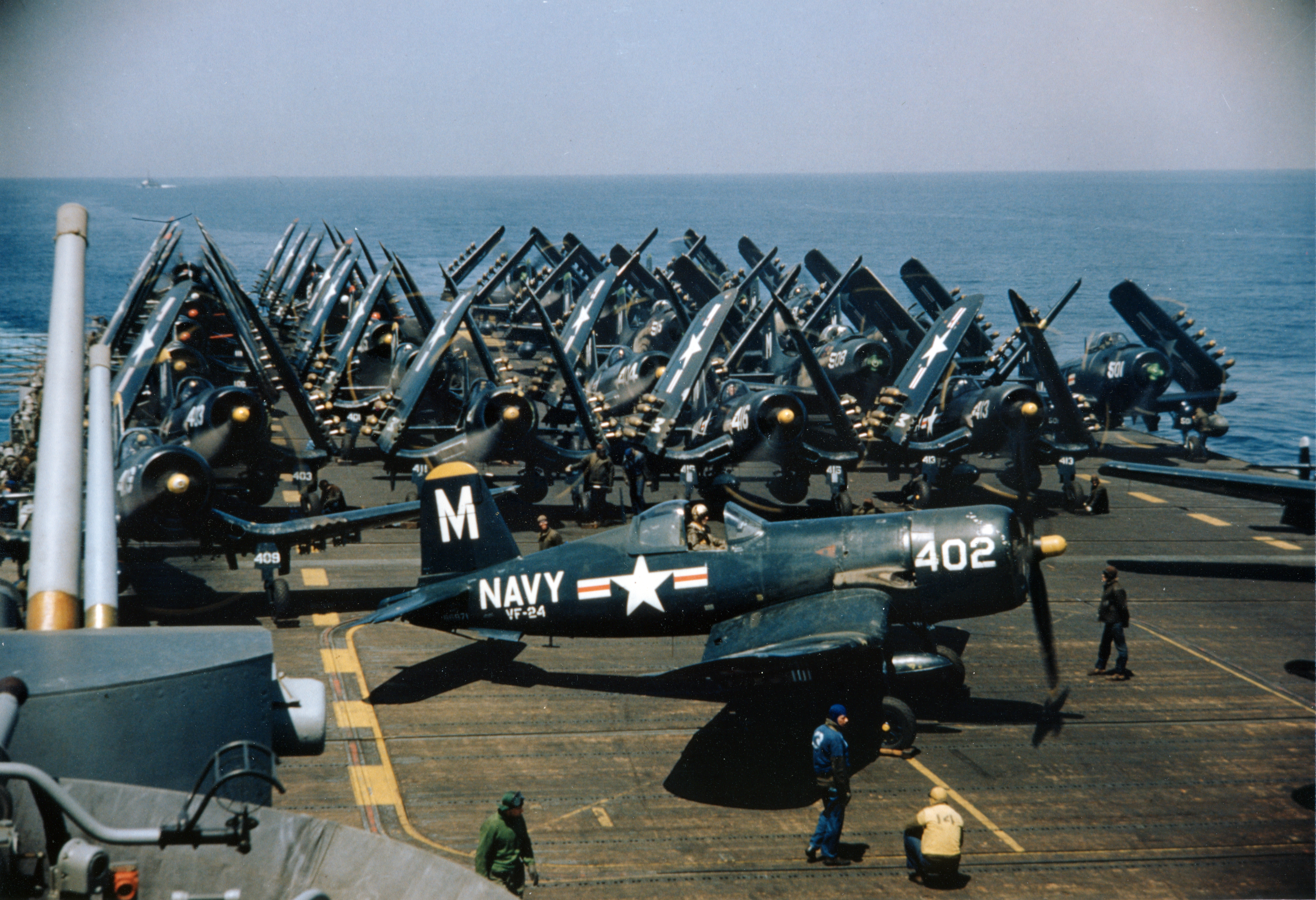
Philippine Sea with F4U Corsairs off Korea in 1951

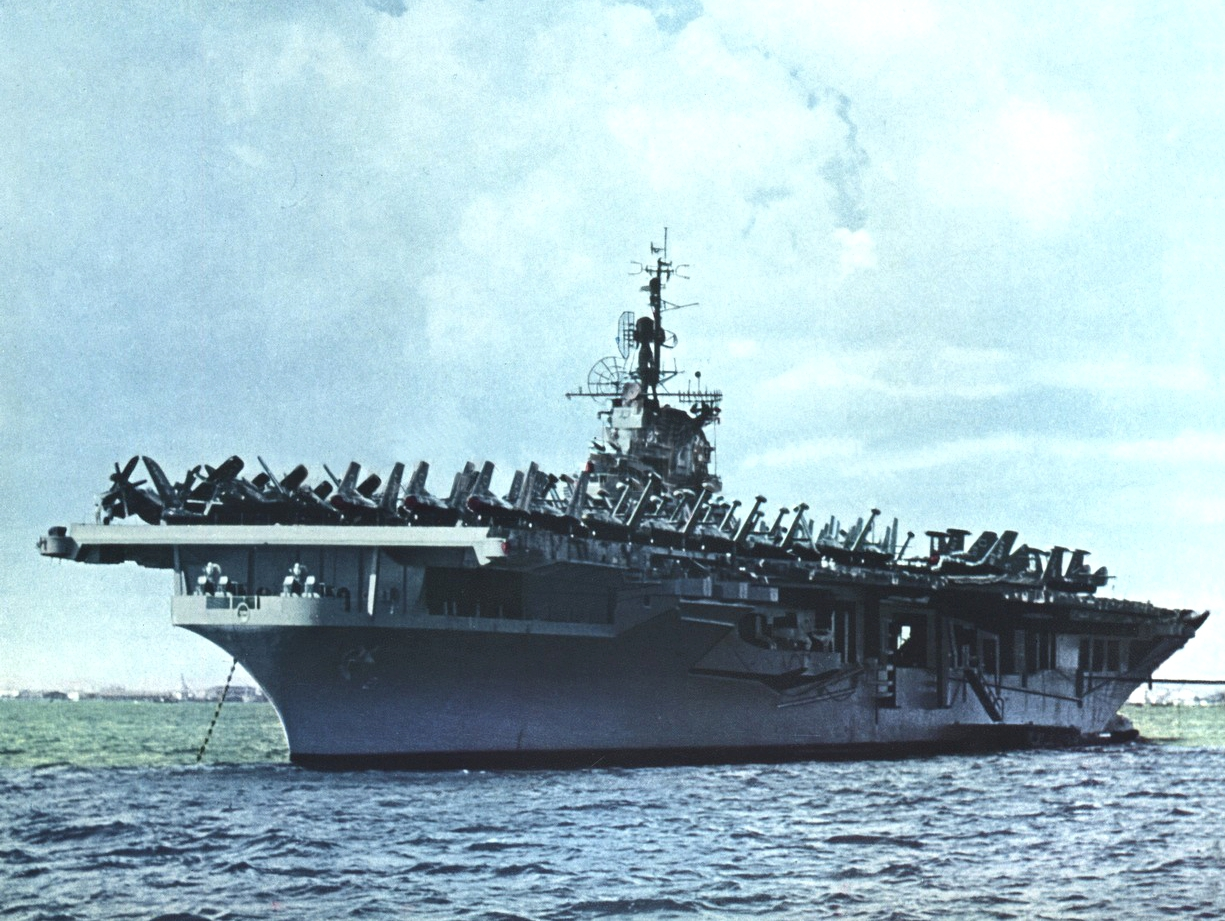
Philippine Sea anchored in 1954

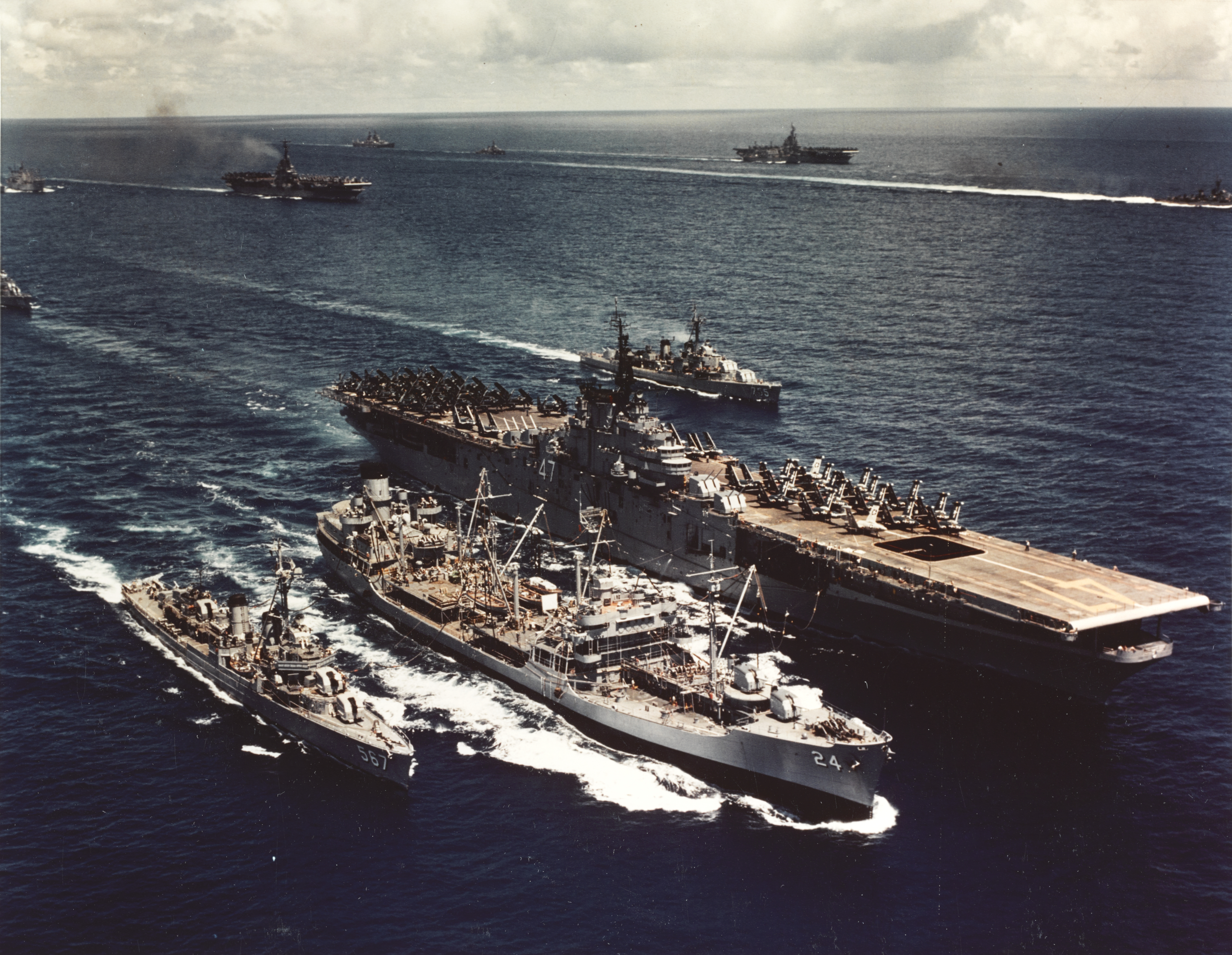
Platte refuels Philippine Sea and Watts on 19 July 1955

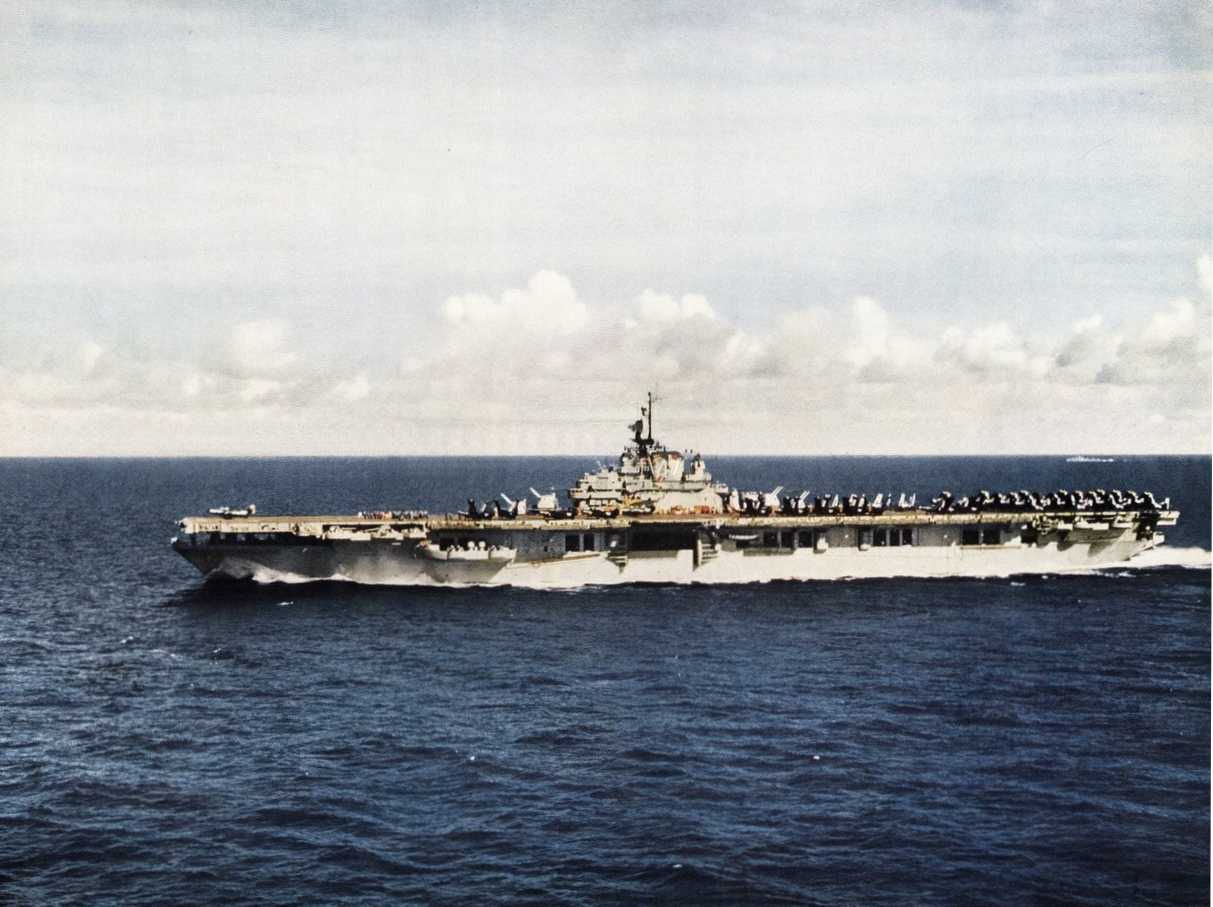
Philippine Sea in 1955

== See also ==
- List of aircraft carriers
