= SS Curtiss =

Marine aviation logistics support ship

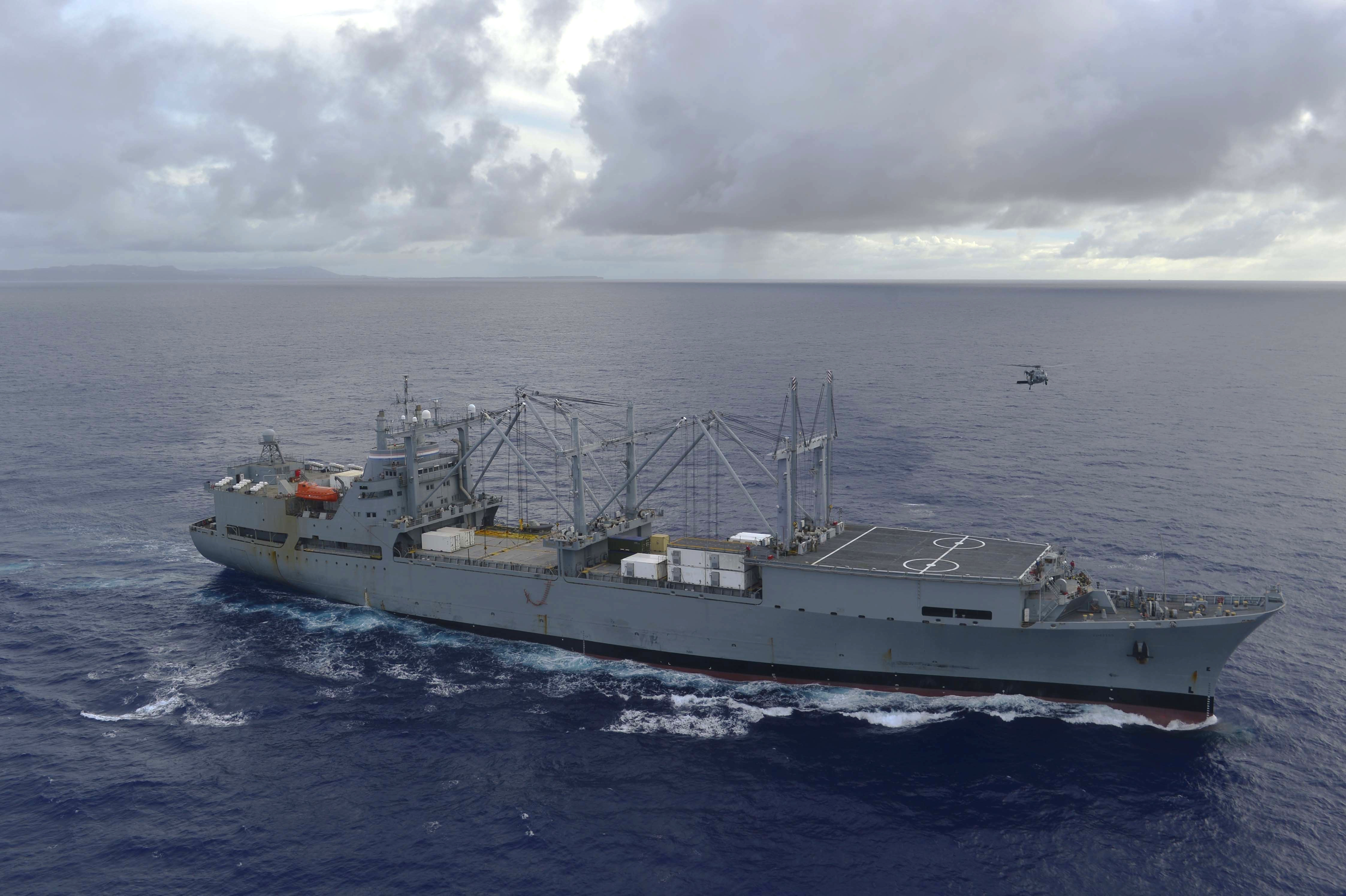
- SS Curtiss (T-AVB-4) underway off Guam on 19 September 2018

History

United States
- Name: SS Curtiss
- Builder: Ingalls Shipbuilding
- Laid down: 1 April 1968
- Launched: 1 December 1968
- Commissioned: 1 July 1969
- Renamed: SS Curtiss (T-AVB-4), 14 May 1986
- Identification: IMO number: 6905288; MMSI number: 366503000; Callsign: WMRM
- Status: in active service

General characteristics
- Class & type: Wright-class Aviation Logistics Support (Roll-on/Roll-off) Container Ship
- Displacement: 8,106 long tons (8,236 t) light; 23,800 long tons (24,182 t) full
- Length: 602 ft (183 m)
- Beam: 90 ft (27 m)
- Draft: 30 ft (9.1 m)
- Propulsion: Geared steam turbine, single propeller
- Speed: 18.7 knots (34.6 km/h; 21.5 mph)
- Complement: 362 (37 merchant mariners and 1 Aircraft Maintenance Detachment)

SS Curtiss (T-AVB-4) is one of two Wright-class aviation logistics support ship converted for the Military Sealift Command by Todd Shipyards in 1987.

== History ==
She was originally laid down on 1 April 1968 at Ingalls Shipbuilding of Pascagoula, Mississippi as SS Mormacksky, ON 521302, IMO 6901830, a Maritime Commission type (C5-S-78a) combination breakbulk, container, Ro-Ro vessel under Maritime Administration contract (MA 222) for Moore-McCormack Lines. Launched 1 December 1968, she was delivered to the Maritime Administration (MARAD) on 25 July 1969 and entered service with Moore-McCormack. After working for that line for only a short time the ship was sold to American Export-Isbrandtsen Lines and renamed SS Great Republic on 19 October 1970. In 1978 she was sold again to Farrell Lines without name change. The ship was turned over to MARAD in 1981.

Converted and renamed SS Curtiss (T-AVB-4) on 14 May 1986, she was assigned to MARAD Ready Reserve Force, (RRF), MSC PM-5 Sealift Program Office, Logistics Prepositioning Force. On 20 August 1990, Marine Aviation Logistics Squadron 16 deployed aboard Curtiss. This was the first time a MALS deployed aboard a T-AVB. In 2001, the activation exercise with Curtis named Pacific Provider 21 was held. This exercise was planned and executed by MALS-16 and was the largest activation of the ship since the Gulf War.

Curtiss is outfitted with both a stern ramp and side ports. The roll-on/roll-off deck runs the complete length of the ship. When outfitted with mobile facilities, the ships can service aircraft while anchored offshore. Curtiss provides intermediate maintenance support for Marine Corps helicopters and fixed wing aircraft. She is maintained in reduced operating status (ROS), with a five-day reactivation requirement, at the Port of Vancouver USA.

Curtiss deploys for biennial training exercises, most recently (2013 and 2015) participating in Exercise Dawn Blitz.

== See also ==
- SS Wright (T-AVB-3)
