= Twenty-ninth of the month =

Recurring ordinal calendar date

The twenty-ninth of the month or twenty-ninth day of the month is the recurring calendar date position corresponding to the day numbered 29 of each month. In the Gregorian calendar (and other calendars that number days sequentially within a month), this day regularly occurs in every month of the year except the month of February, which only has 28 days outside of leap years, when it has 29. In non-leap years, this day occurs eleven times during the year, and in leap years, this is the highest day number that appears on the calendar in every month of the year.

- Twenty-ninth of January
- Twenty-ninth of February
- Twenty-ninth of March
- Twenty-ninth of April
- Twenty-ninth of May
- Twenty-ninth of June
- Twenty-ninth of July
- Twenty-ninth of August
- Twenty-ninth of September
- Twenty-ninth of October
- Twenty-ninth of November
- Twenty-ninth of December

In addition to these dates, this date occurs in months of many other calendars, such as the Bengali calendar and the Hebrew calendar.

== See also ==
- 29th (disambiguation)
