= Marine Aviation Logistics Squadron 16 =

- Active: 1 March 1952 – present
- Country: United States
- Allegiance: United States of America
- Branch: United States Marine Corps
- Type: Logistics
- Role: Aviation logistics support
- Part of: Marine Aircraft Group 16; 3rd Marine Aircraft Wing
- Garrison/HQ: Marine Corps Air Station Miramar
- Nickname: Immortals
- Motto: "Best Supporting the Best"
- Engagements: Operation Iraqi Freedom; Operation Enduring Freedom

Commanders
- Current commander: LtCol. Martin

The Marine Aviation Logistics Squadron 16 (MALS-16) is an aviation logistics support unit of the United States Marine Corps. Known as the Immortals (formerly known as the “Forerunners”), they are currently based at Marine Corps Air Station Miramar and fall under the command of Marine Aircraft Group 16 (MAG-16) and the 3rd Marine Aircraft Wing (3rd MAW).

== Mission ==
To provide aviation logistics support, guidance, planning and direction to Marine Aircraft Group 16 squadrons on behalf of the commanding officer. To provide intermediate level maintenance for aircraft and aeronautical equipment of all supported units and, when authorized, perform first-degree repair on specific engines. To provide aviation supply support for aircraft and Navy-funded equipment to all supported units. To provide Class V(a) ammunition logistics support to the MAG's squadrons. This support encompasses the requisitioning, storage, handling, assembly, transportation, and inventory reporting of Class V(a) ammunition. To be capable of planning for, and operating, an airfield ammunition issue point at expeditionary airfields. To interpret, implement, audit, inspect, and provide oversight for the MAG, CO, of all policies and procedures relating to the administration and management of operations and maintenance, Navy funds, aviation supply, and aircraft.

== History ==
=== Early years ===
MALS-16 was activated on 1 March 1952, as Headquarters Squadron 16 at Marine Corps Air Facility Santa Ana, California. The primary mission of the squadron was to provide logistical and administrative support for units attached to the newly formed Marine Aircraft Group 16.

The squadron remained at MCAF Santa Ana until the end of July 1953 when all of the MAG-16 began movement to Japan and became part of the 1st Marine Aircraft Wing. On 14 August 1953, the squadron commenced operations at Hanshin Auxiliary Air Base, Honshu, Japan.

On 15 February 1954, the unit was redesignated as Headquarters and Maintenance Squadron 16 (H&MS-16) and given the additional mission of providing intermediate level aviation maintenance support for MAG-16 units. During April 1954, the squadron moved to Naval Air Facility Oppama. During the squadron's seven-year stay in Japan, elements of the unit participated in numerous operations and exercises including "Strong Back" in 1958, "Sea Turtle" in 1959, and "Blue Star" in 1960.

=== Vietnam War ===
In April 1962, elements of Marine Aircraft Group 16, including some H&MS-16 personnel, deployed to South Vietnam and Thailand to provide support for the Vietnamese in their struggle against the Viet Cong. In March 1965, the squadron left Okinawa and was stationed at Da Nang Air Base, Republic of Vietnam. While in Vietnam, it provided support for MAG-16, one of the largest Marine Air Groups in the history of the Marine Corps. For its Vietnam Service, the squadron was awarded one Presidential Unit Citation, two Navy Unit Commendations and two Meritorious Unit Citations.

=== 1970s & 1980s ===
In June 1971, H&MS-16 returned to Marine Corps Air Station, Helicopter (MCAS {H} Santa Ana, California). As H&MS-16's stateside operations settled, it moved to "Hangar 3", during February 1972. With increased responsibilities and operations, H&MS-16 expanded into its first two mobile maintenance facilities in August 1973.

Over the years, H&MS-16's capabilities and size have grown as MAG-16 gained additional squadrons and updated its helicopters. The expansion of Avionics, Power Plants, Ground Support Equipment, and the Aviation Supply complexes are just a few of the major changes that have taken place. The squadron has lived up to its motto of the "Best Supporting the Best" by earning numerous awards. They include 10 consecutive V. C. Sledge Awards for T-64 engine support and the DOD Maintenance Excellence Award in 1988 and 1991. Additionally, the supply department was selected as the first west coast Navy/Marine Corps unit to implement shipboard Uniform Automated Data Processing System (SUADPS) Release III in 1998, a major inventory and financial software package update. Most importantly, over the years the squadron has led the way in Intermediate Maintenance Activity (IMA) productivity and material accountability by consistently surpassing higher headquarters standards and goals.

On 1 October 1988 H&MS-16 was redesignated as Marine Aviation Logistics Squadron 16 (MALS16). This change provided a new organizational structure to better serve the requirements of MAG-16 squadrons and to meet the challenges of Marine Air-Ground Task Force (MAGTF) deployments.

=== 1990s ===
On 20 August 1990, MALS-16 established a significant number of firsts in Marine and Naval Aviation: the first MALS to deploy, the first MALS to deploy in support of combat operations, and the first MALS to deploy aboard an Aviation Logistics Support Ship (T-AVB), SS Curtiss (T-AVB-4).

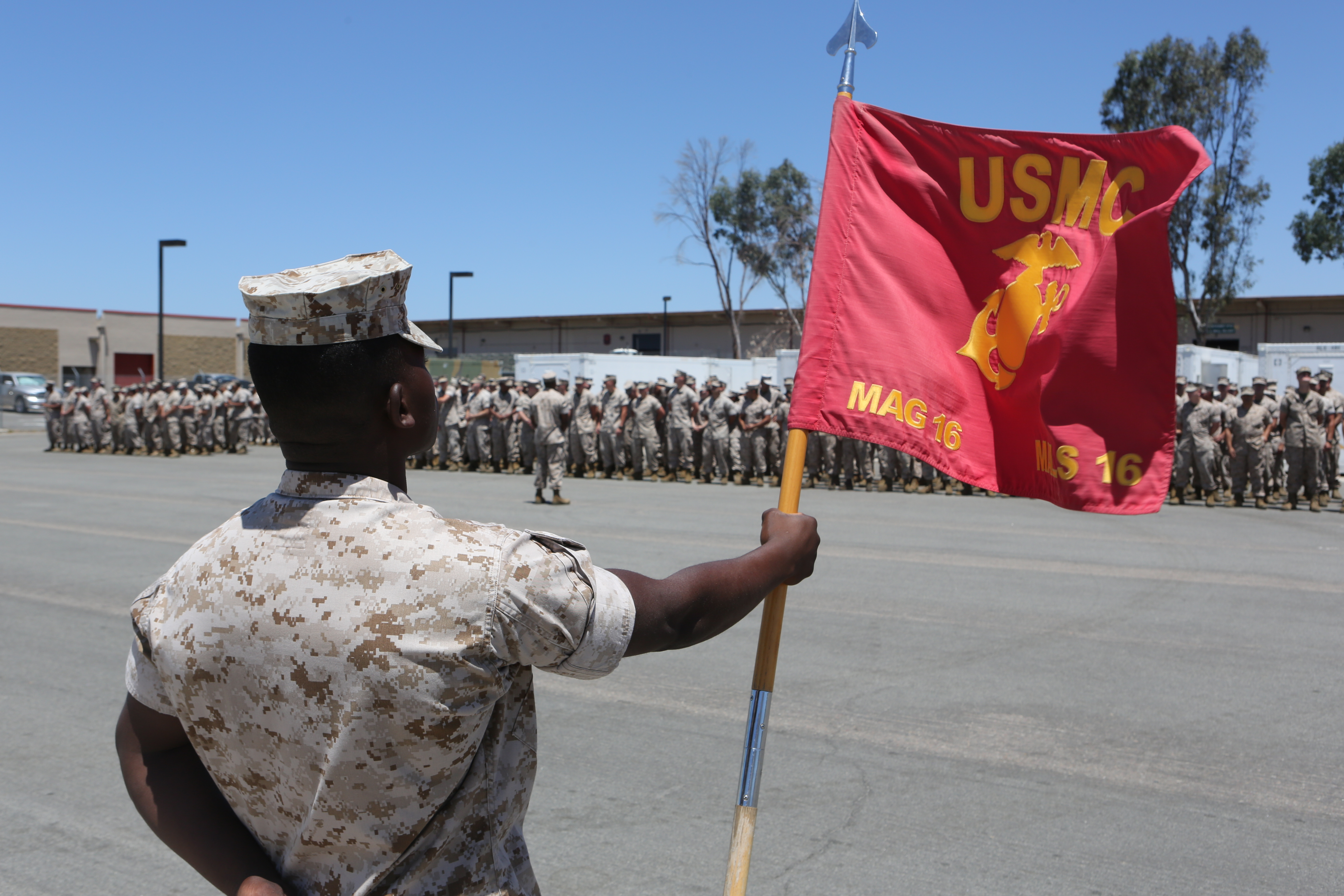
On 13 June 2014, MALS-16 Marines stand at parade rest before a congratulatory speech given by Col. Anthony Bianca, Marine Aircraft Group (MAG) 16 commanding officer, after passing an aviation maintenance inspection with a grade of 100 percent. Photo By: Cpl. Owen Kimbrel

On 17 January 1991, operation Desert Storm was born as the U.S. launched an offensive attack to drive the Iraqi army from Kuwait. MALS-16 provided logistical support to over 106 aircraft which were dispersed at several sites and operated in a tremendously harsh environment. On 18 January 1991, MALS Marines landed at El Jabbar airfield during a fire fight and started EOD clearing operations to prepare the airfield for flight operations. These MALS Marines were awarded a combat action ribbon. The squadron returned to Tustin, California on 18 March 1991.

MALS-16 was the first MALS in the Marine Corps to receive the prestigious Department of Defense "Phoenix Award" for the period of October 1990 to September 1991 and the first MALS in the Third Aircraft Wing to receive the Mike Yunick Award for superior performance from July 1990 to June 1991.

In December 1992, MALS-16 forward deployed in support of Commander Marine Forces Somalia during Operation Restore Hope. These Marines supported all Marine aircraft used in Somalia while providing base and convoy security. One MALS Marine was awarded a purple heart.

From 18 March to 7 April 1995, as the "lead" MALS in support of Operation Kernel Blitz 95, MALS-16 supervised the activation, load, intermediate level aviation logistics support operations, off-load and retrograde of the SS Curtiss T-AVB-4. In November 1995, MALS-16 established dual site operations in support of MAG-16 CH-46E squadrons being relocated to MCAS El Toro while maintaining support for the CH-53D/E squadrons still located at MCAS Tustin.

In September 1998, MALS-16 embarked on its migration to Marine Corps Air Station (MCAS) Miramar, California.

== See also ==
- United States Marine Corps Aviation
- Organization of the United States Marine Corps
- List of United States Marine Corps aviation support units
