= SS Wright =

Marine aviation logistics support ship

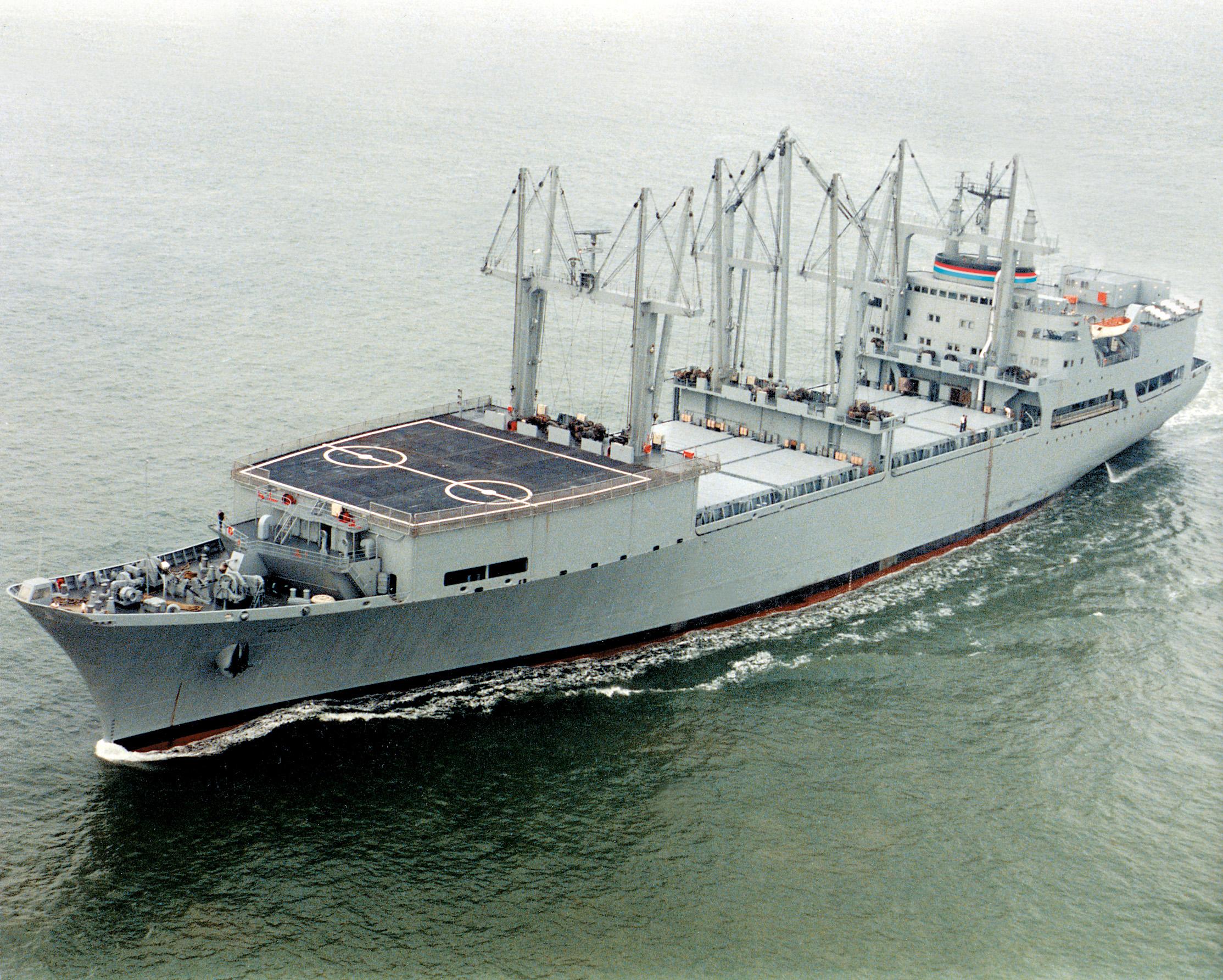
- SS Wright

History

United States
- Name: SS Wright
- Builder: Ingalls Shipbuilding, Inc., Pascagoula, Mississippi
- Laid down: 1 June 1968
- Launched: 1 July 1969
- Acquired: 1 February 1970
- Renamed: SS Wright (T-AVB-3), 14 May 1986
- Identification: IMO number: 6924571; MMSI number: 368808000; Callsign: WGLW
- Status: in active service

General characteristics
- Class & type: Wright-class Aviation Logistics Support (Roll-on/Roll-off) Container Ship
- Displacement: 8,106 long tons (8,236 t) light; 23,800 long tons (24,182 t) full
- Length: 602 ft (183 m)
- Beam: 90 ft (27 m)
- Draft: 30 ft (9.1 m)
- Propulsion: Geared steam turbine, single propeller
- Speed: 18.7 knots (34.6 km/h; 21.5 mph)
- Complement: 362 (37 merchant mariners and 1 Aircraft Maintenance Detachment)

SS Wright (T-AVB-3) is one of two Aviation Logistics Support (Roll-on/Roll-off) Container Ships converted for the United States Navy in 1986, along with sister ship SS Curtiss (T-AVB-4). The ship honors aviation pioneers the Wright brothers.

== History ==
The lead ship of her class, she was originally laid down 1 June 1968 at Ingalls Shipbuilding of Pascagoula, Mississippi as SS Mormacsun, ON 524416, IMO 6924571, a Maritime Commission type (C5-S-78) combination breakbulk, container, Ro-Ro vessel under Maritime Administration contract (MA 224) for Moore-McCormack Lines. Launched 1 July 1969, she was delivered to the Maritime Administration (MARAD) 1 February 1970 and subsequently sold and renamed SS Young America on 19 October 1970 for service with American Export-Isbrandtsen Lines. In 1978 the ship was sold again to Farrell Lines without name change. In 1981 the ship was turned over to MARAD. Converted and renamed SS Wright (T-AVB-3) on 14 May 1986, the ship was assigned to MARAD Ready Reserve Force (RRF), MSC PM-5 Sealift Program Office, Logistics Prepositioning Force.

Wright provides support for Marine Corps helicopters. Wright is outfitted with both a stern ramp and side ports. Their roll-on/roll-off deck runs the complete length of the ship. When outfitted with mobile facilities, the ships can service aircraft while anchored offshore.

== Government service ==
On 27 August 1990, Marine Aviation Logistics Squadron 14 (MALS-14) FWD deployed aboard Wright to the Persian Gulf for Operation Desert Shield. The deployment's complement of Marines included aircraft maintenance and supply specialists from several Marine Corps bases located on the east coast of the United States. After debarking the rotary wing support package in Saudi Arabia, Wright berthed at the port in Manama, Bahrain where the balance of MALS-14 FWD provided support to Marine Corps squadrons stationed in that country.

MALS-14 FWD debarked from Wright in December 1990 at the port of Al Jubayl to continue operations ashore. MALS-29 (Reinforced) boarded Wright Jan 3, 1991. She was to remain in port to provide support for other operations in support of Operations Desert Shield and Desert Storm.

From January 2003 to July 2003, approximately 330 Marines, Sailors and civilians comprising Marine Aviation Logistics Squadron (MALS) 14 (-)(Reinforced) Forward, from 12 Marine Corps units and four major bases or air stations were deployed aboard Wright to provide intermediate level maintenance support – including airframes, avionics, ordnance, aviation life support systems, and aviation supply to Marine Aircraft Group 11 Forward ashore, and to other Marine Corps aviation forces afloat during the Operation Iraqi Freedom. There were approximately 20 to 40 civilian contractors crewing the ship. In December 2002, Wright departed from Baltimore, Maryland and in January ported in Morehead City, North Carolina. Marines and contractors loaded the ship and departed in January for the Persian Gulf.

In November 2012 Wright was mobilized to support relief operations after Hurricane Sandy caused damage to the New York/New Jersey region. The ship served as lodging for American Red Cross volunteers, Americorps, FEMA corps, Montana Conservation Corps, Washington Conservation Corps and Virginia Military Institute all who were deployed to support the organizations Hurricane Sandy response. The ship shared a dock near the St George ferry on Staten Island, NY with the USTS Kennedy which served as lodging for FEMA staff and contractors.

In September 2017, Wright was mobilized to support relief operations with 1.1 million MREs for the United States Virgin Islands after Hurricane Irma and Hurricane Maria destroyed much of the islands' infrastructure.

== Awards ==
- Global War on Terrorism Expeditionary Medal with star
- Global War on Terrorism Service Medal
- Humanitarian Service Medal
- Kuwait Liberation Medal (Saudi Arabia)
- Kuwait Liberation Medal (Kuwait)
- National Defense Service Medal with star
- Presidential Unit Citation (Operation Iraqi Freedom)
- Southwest Asia Service Medal

== See also ==
- SS Curtiss (T-AVB-4)
