= 29 =

29 may refer to:

- 29 (number), the natural number following 28 and preceding 30
- one of the years 29 BC, AD 29, 1929, 2029

== Science ==
- Copper, a transition metal in the periodic table
- 29 Amphitrite, an asteroid in the asteroid belt

== Music ==
- 29 (album), by Ryan Adams (2005)
- "29" (Loïc Nottet song) (2019)
- "29" (Demi Lovato song) (2022)
- "Twenty Nine", a song by Karma to Burn from Wild, Wonderful Purgatory (1999)

== Other uses ==
- 29, a variant of Twenty-eight (card game)
- 29 (film), an upcoming Indian Tamil-language film
- Twenty-Nine, also known as 29, a 1969 British short drama film

== See also ==
- 29th (disambiguation)
