= 29th Division =

29th Division may refer to:

== Infantry divisions ==
- 29th Division (People's Republic of China)
- 29th Division (German Empire)
- 29th Infantry Division (Wehrmacht)
- 29th Waffen Grenadier Division of the SS RONA (1st Russian)
- 29th Waffen Grenadier Division of the SS (1st Italian)
- 29th Infantry Division "Piemonte", Kingdom of Italy
- 29th Division (Imperial Japanese Army)
- 29th Infantry Division (Poland)
- 29th Infantry Division (Russian Empire)
- 29th Guards Motor Rifle Division, Soviet Union, earlier the 29th Guards Mechanized Division
- 29th Guards Rifle Division, Soviet Union
- 29th Rifle Division, Soviet Union, later the 29th Motor Rifle Division
- 29th Division (Spain)
- 29th Division (United Kingdom)
- 29th Infantry Division (United States)
- 29th Division (Yugoslav Partisans)

== Aviation divisions ==
- 29th Fighter Division, People's Republic of China
- 29th Air Division, United States
- 29th Aviation Division, Socialist Yugoslavia

== Other divisions ==
- 29th Guards Rocket Division, Soviet Union
- 29th Naval Surface Ships Division, Ukraine

== See also ==
- 29th Division War Memorial
- List of military divisions by number
- 29th Army (disambiguation)
- XXIX Corps (disambiguation)
- 29th Brigade (disambiguation)
- 29th Regiment (disambiguation)
- 29th Battalion (disambiguation)
- 29th Squadron (disambiguation)
