= 29th Cavalry Regiment (United States) =

29th Cavalry Regiment (Composite School)
- Active: 1943–1944
- Country: United States
- Branch: United States Army
- Type: Cavalry
- Garrison/HQ: Fort Riley

The 29th Cavalry Regiment (Composite School) was a United States Army cavalry that briefly existed during World War II. It was activated in 1943 at Fort Riley and inactivated in 1944.

== History ==
The 29th Cavalry Regiment (Composite School) was constituted on 19 December 1942 and activated on 23 January 1943 at Fort Riley. It was part of the Replacement and School Command there and was commanded by Lieutenant Colonel (temporary Colonel) Thomas T. Thornburgh. The regiment was inactivated at Fort Riley on 1 May 1944. It was disbanded on 12 December 1951, and was never authorized a coat of arms or distinctive unit insignia.
