= Marine Aviation Logistics Squadron 29 =

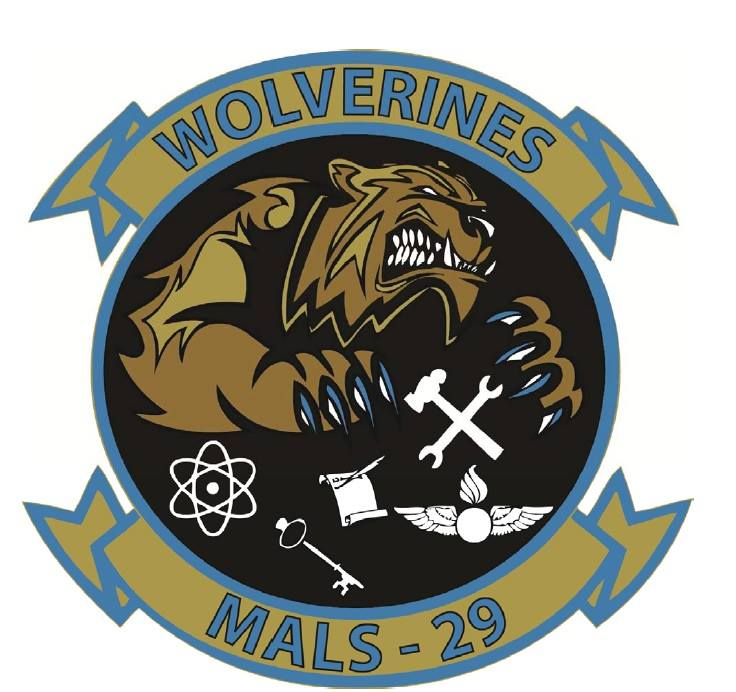
- MALS-29 Insignia
- Active: 1 May 1972–8 December 2023
- Country: United States
- Branch: United States Marine Corps
- Type: Logistics
- Role: Aviation logistics support
- Part of: Marine Aircraft Group 29; 2nd Marine Aircraft Wing
- Garrison/HQ: Marine Corps Air Station New River
- Nickname(s): Wolverines
- Engagements: Operation Desert Storm; Operation Iraqi Freedom; Operation Enduring Freedom

Commanders
- Current commander: LtCol J E. Beeson

Marine Aviation Logistics Squadron 29 (MALS-29) was an aviation logistics support unit of the United States Marine Corps. Known as the "Wolverines", they fell under the command of Marine Aircraft Group 29 and the 2nd Marine Aircraft Wing and were based at Marine Corps Air Station New River. MALS 29 supported multiple types of aircraft and provided detachments to aviation combat elements operating globally in support of the United States National Defense Strategy.

== Mission ==
Provide aviation logistics support, guidance, planning and direction to Marine Aircraft Group squadrons on behalf of the commanding officer, as well as logistics support for Navy funded equipment in the supporting Marine Wing Support Squadron (MWSS), Marine Air Control Group (MACG), and Marine Aircraft Wing/Mobile Calibration Complex (MAW/MCC).

== History ==
=== Early years ===
Headquarters and Maintenance Squadron 29 (H&MS-29) was commissioned at Marine Corps Air Station New River, North Carolina and assigned to Marine Aircraft Group 29 (MAG-29) on May 1, 1972. During the years from 1972 through 1976, H&MS-29 operated the MAG-29 Aerial Observer School and performed its primary mission as an Intermediate Maintenance and Supply support activity.

On 1 October 1988, H&MS-29 was re-designated as Marine Aviation Logistics Squadron 29 (MALS-29) as a result of the implementation of the Marine Aviation Logistics Support Package concept.

=== 1990s ===
In August 1990, MALS-29 commenced its support of Operation Desert Shield by deploying four detachments aboard L-Class ships in direct support of Marine Aircraft Group 40 (MAG-40), 4th Marine Expeditionary Brigade. Additionally, during December 1990, MALS-29, under the operational control of Marine Aircraft Group 26 (MAG-26), deployed to Southwest Asia. MALS-29 was a participant in Operation Desert Storm and distinguished itself with several first-time aviation logistics actions, including operating a fully functional rotary wing Intermediate Maintenance Activity aboard the SS Wright (T-AVB-3), while continuously supporting MAG-26 during the ground war. On 22 May 1991, the squadron recalled its personnel, who were disbursed throughout the Kuwaiti theater of operations, and during June 1991, redeployed itself at MCAS New River, NC. The reconstitution of the Intermediate Maintenance Activity in support of MAG-29 was completed on 1 August 1991.

From 1992 through 1999, MALS-29 continued to support MAG-29 tactical aircraft operations. Over this period, the Squadron underwent extensive changes in personnel and logistical support with the decommissioning of VMO-1 and the transfer of HMT-302 to MAG-29. During 1996, participation in Operation Decisive Endeavor in Bosnia, Operation Assured Response in Liberia, Operation Silver Wake in Albania, and tactical operations in Zaire demonstrated MALS-29's ability to provide expeditionary support around the globe. In 1999, participation in Operation Allied Force, Operation Allied Harbor, Operation Noble Anvil and Operation Joint Guardian placed the MALS-29 detachment within the Aviation Combat Element of the 26th Marine Expeditionary Unit (26th MEU) in support of the Ground Combat Elements peacekeeping mission surrounding the Kosovo Conflict.. Before returning home, the MEU was called to Turkey for disaster relief from the tragic earthquakes for Operation Avid Response.

=== 2000s ===
MALS 29 provides Intermediate Level Maintenance (second echelon), Aviation Supply, Class V Munitions / Ordnance, Aeronautical Equipment, Logistical and Information Technology products and services to the flying squadrons of Marine Aircraft Group 29 based in Jacksonville North Carolina. In 2019, MALS 29 is composed of more than 700 Marines, Sailors and civilians in over 35 different aviation technical jobs.

=== Global War on Terror ===
In January 2003, MALS-29 deployed in support of Operation Enduring Freedom and a possible larger scale conflict in Iraq. The squadron developed a unique and flexible concept of logistics support while embarking personnel, equipment, and supplies aboard four L-class ships as part of Task Force Tarawa. From multiple sites throughout the theater and deep into Iraq, MALS-29 supported more than 6,000 flight hours and over 3,700 combat sorties during Operation Iraqi Freedom, giving MAG-29 over 400 miles (640 km) of reach inland and the flexibility to leapfrog great distances in pursuit of operational objectives. Throughout the duration of combat operations, MAG-29 squadrons maintained a combined average 81 percent mission capable rate and a 60 percent full mission capable rate.

In March 2004, the Wolverine logistical support was called upon via the activation of the Air Contingency MAGTF in support of security operations in Haiti. MALS-29 deployed again to Iraq in support of Operation Iraqi Freedom in January 2007 for one year and returned February 2008.

== Gallery ==
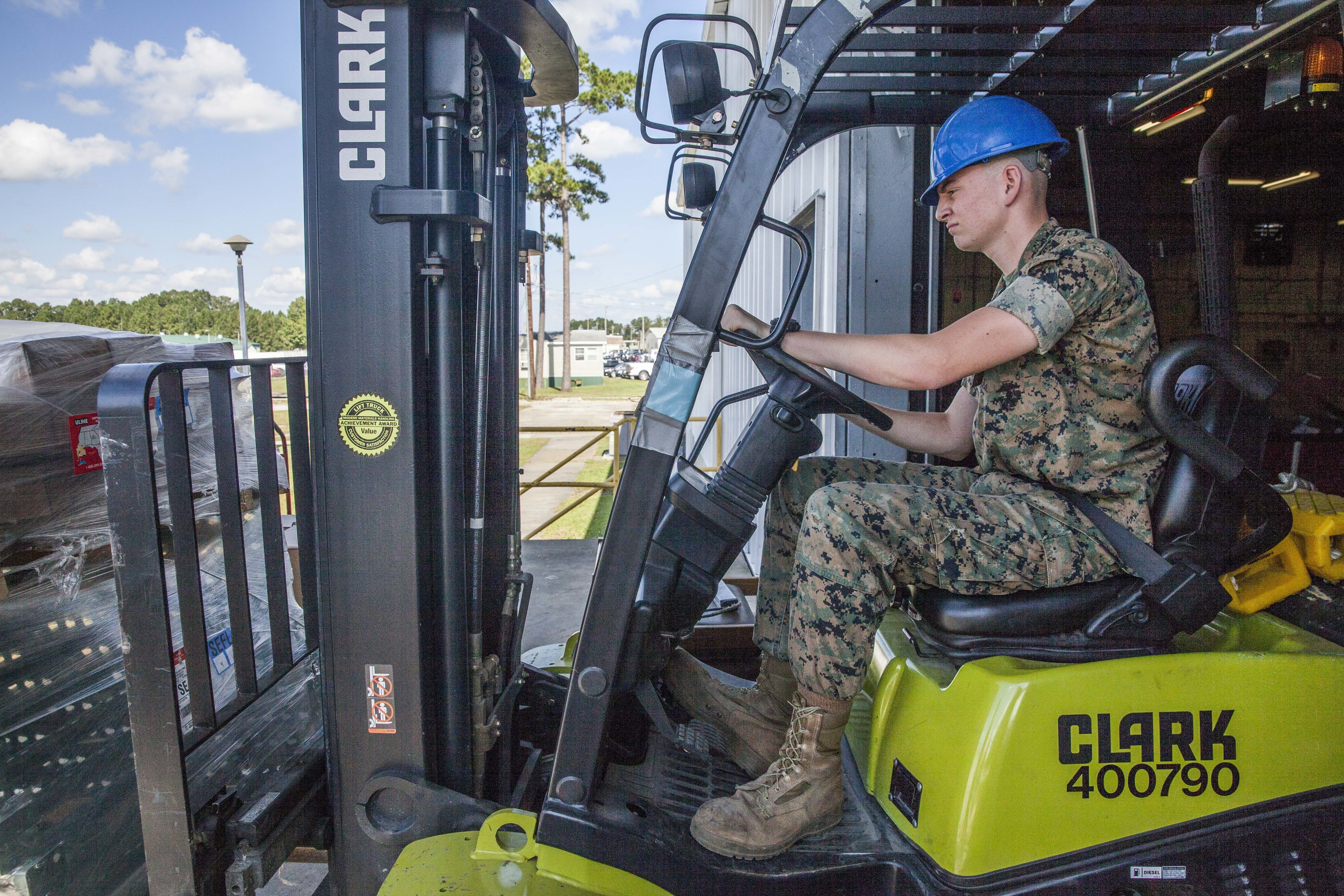
Aviation Supply, Warehousing, and Distribution operations.

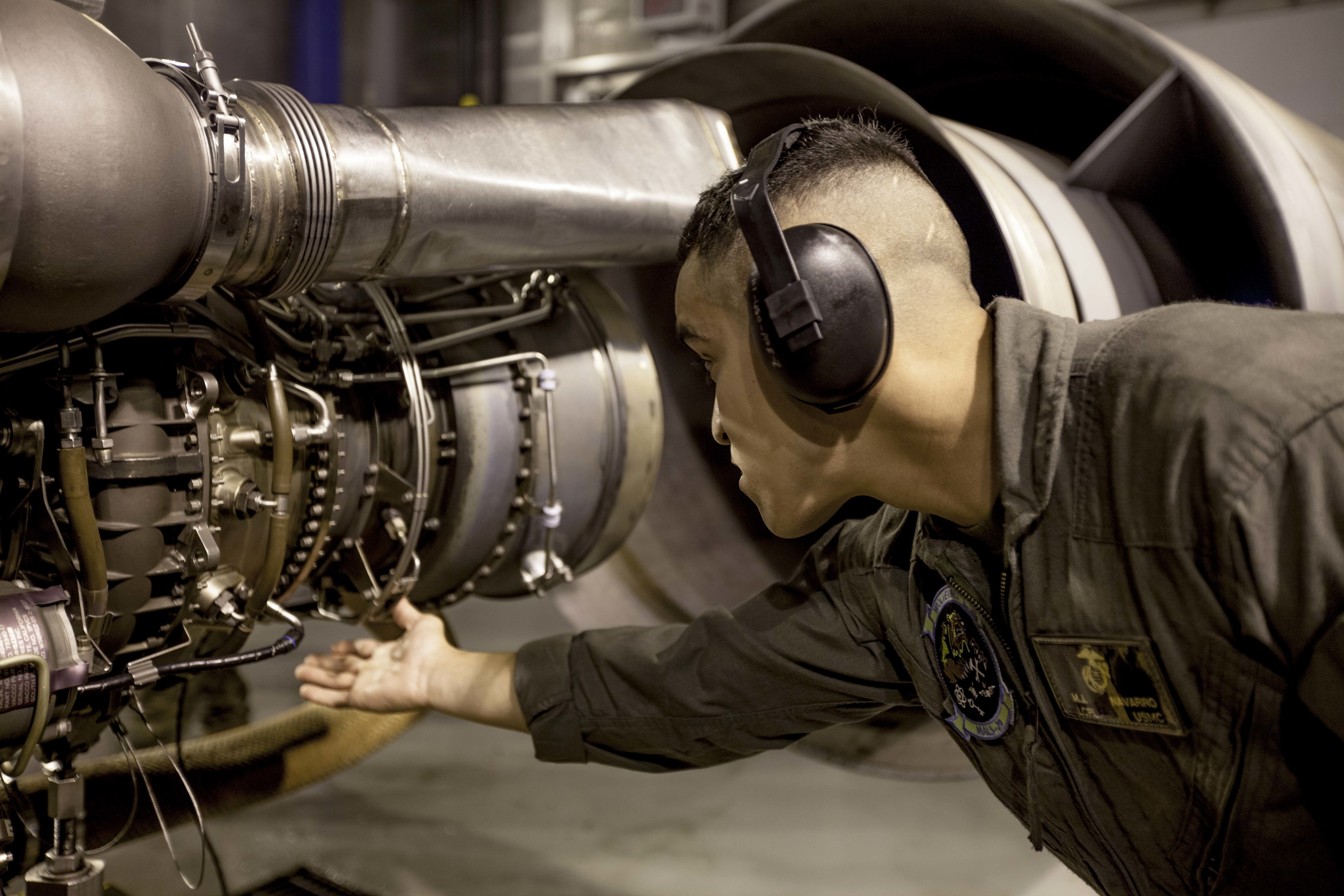
Turboshaft engine troubleshooting, repair and testing.

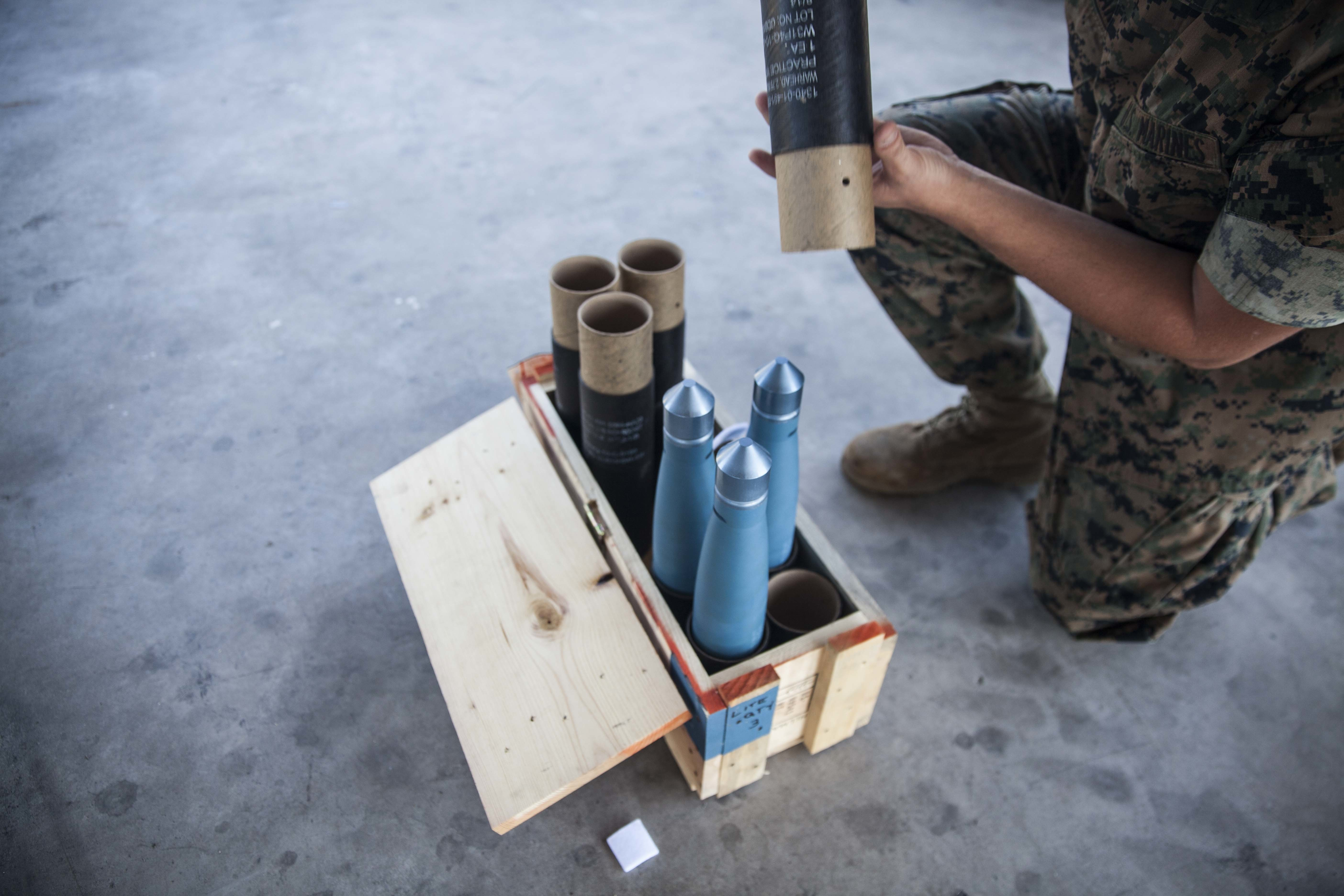
Class V munitions building, delivery and aircraft loading.

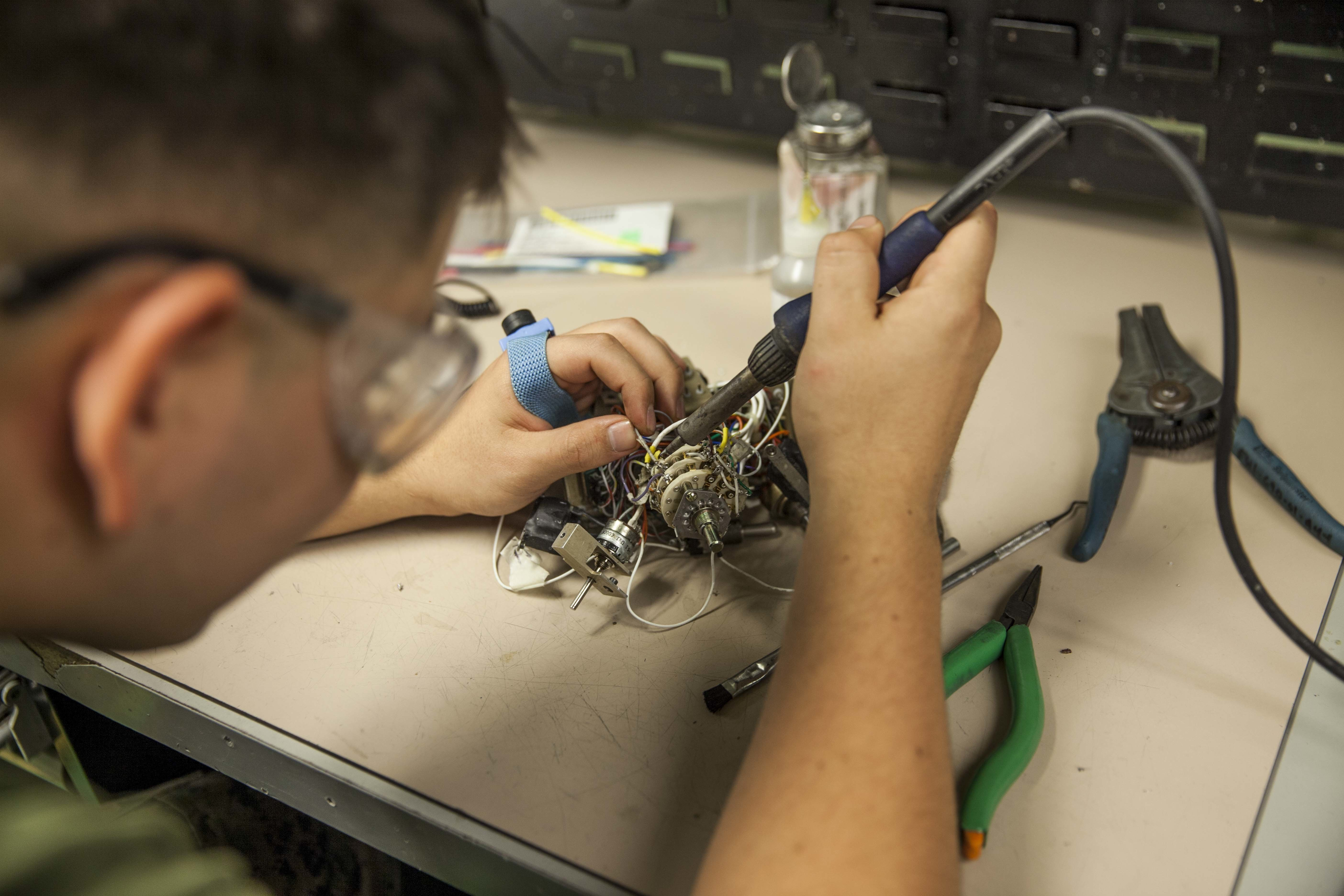
Second Echelon aircraft component maintenance.

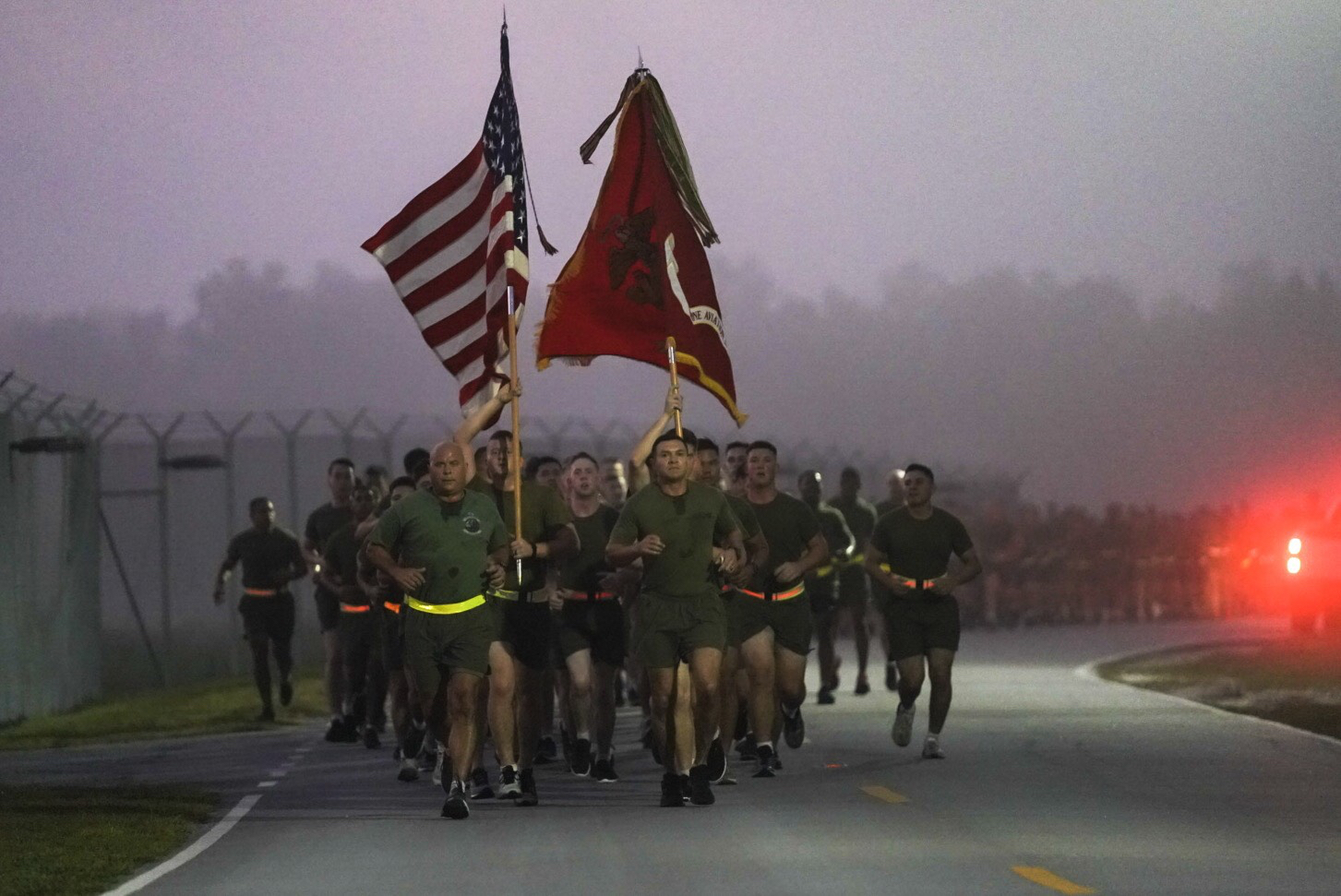
Wolverines conducting squadron level physical training.

== See also ==
- United States Marine Corps Aviation
- Organization of the United States Marine Corps
- List of United States Marine Corps aviation support units
