= 29th Street =

29th Street may refer to:

- 29th Street (Sacramento RT), Sacramento, California
- Twenty Ninth Street (Boulder, Colorado)
- 29th Street (Manhattan), New York
- 29th Street (film) - a 1991 film by George Gallo
