= 29th Regiment =

29th Regiment or 29th Infantry Regiment may refer to:

- 29th (Punjab) Bengal Infantry
- 29th Field Artillery Regiment
- 29th Infantry Regiment (Greece)
- 29th Infantry Regiment (United States)
- 29th (Kent) Searchlight Regiment, Royal Artillery
- 29th (Worcestershire) Regiment of Foot

American Civil War regiments

Confederate (Southern) Army regiments

- 29th Arkansas Infantry Regiment

Union (Northern) Army regiments

- 29th Illinois Volunteer Infantry Regiment
- 29th Indiana Infantry Regiment
- 29th Iowa Volunteer Infantry Regiment
- 29th Regiment Kentucky Volunteer Infantry
- 29th Maine Volunteer Infantry Regiment
- 29th Regiment Massachusetts Volunteer Infantry
- 29th Michigan Volunteer Infantry Regiment
- 29th New York Volunteer Infantry Regiment
- 29th Ohio Infantry
- 29th Virginia Infantry
- 29th Wisconsin Volunteer Infantry Regiment
- 29th Regiment, United States Colored Infantry

== See also ==
- 29th Division (disambiguation)
- 29th Brigade (disambiguation)
- 29 Squadron (disambiguation)
