= 29th Brigade =

29th Brigade or 29th Infantry Brigade may refer to:

== Australia ==
- 29th Brigade (Australia)

== Greece ==
- 29th Infantry Brigade (Greece)

== India ==
- 29th Indian Brigade of the British Indian Army in the First World War
- 29th Indian Infantry Brigade of the British Indian Army in the Second World War

== Ukraine ==
- 29th Heavy Mechanized Brigade

== United Kingdom ==
- 29th (East Anglian) Anti-Aircraft Brigade
- 29th Armoured Brigade (United Kingdom)
- 29th Engineer Brigade
- 29th Infantry Brigade (United Kingdom)
- 29th Brigade Royal Field Artillery

== United States ==
- 29th Infantry Brigade Combat Team

== See also ==
- 29th Division (disambiguation)
- 29th Regiment (disambiguation)
