= 29 Squadron =

29 Squadron or 29th Squadron may refer to:

- No. 29 Squadron IAF, a unit of the Indian Air Force
- No. 29 Squadron RAAF, a unit of the Royal Australian Air Force
- No. 29 Squadron RAF, a unit of the United Kingdom Royal Air Force
- No. 29 Squadron RSAF, a unit of the Royal Saudi Air Force
- 29 Squadron PN, a unit of the Pakistan Navy
- 29 Squadron SAAF, a unit of the South African Air Force during the Second World War
- Marine Aviation Logistics Squadron 29, a unit of the United States Marine Corps
- VP-29 (Patrol Squadron 29), a unit of the United States Navy
- VP-29 (1946–1955), a unit of the United States Navy
- VPB-29 (Patrol Bombing Squadron 29), a unit of the United States Navy
- VS-29 (Sea Control Squadron 29), a unit of the United States Navy
