= Pinho =

Pinho (Portuguese pronunciation: [ˈpiɲu] — pine in the Portuguese language) is a Portuguese surname. Notable people with the surname include:

- Carlos João Pinho Coelho (born 1953), former Portuguese footballer
- António Avelar de Pinho (born 1947), Portuguese singer and songwriter from Entroncamento
- António Pinho (born 1899), Portuguese footballer
- Caetano Pinho, former Indian footballer, coach, manager of ONGC F.C.
- Cláudio Christovam de Pinho, the biggest scorer of all time for Corinthians
- João Pinho (born 1992), Portuguese footballer
- Manuel Pinho (born 1954), Portuguese economist and a former Minister of Economy with no political affiliation
- Stefano Pinho (born 1991), Brazilian professional soccer player
- Tony da Costa Pinho (born 1983), Brazilian footballer
- Ana de Pinho Rodrigues or Ana Rodrigues (born 1994), Portuguese swimmer
- Ricardo Andre de Pinho Sousa or Ricardo Sousa (born 1979), Portuguese retired footballer
- Robert de Pinho de Souza (born 1981), association footballer
- António Pinho Vargas (born 1951), Portuguese composer and pianist (Jazz and contemporary music)

== See also ==
- Uma flor de verde pinho ("A green-pine flower"), Portuguese entry in the Eurovision Song Contest 1976
- Campinho (disambiguation)
- Espinho (disambiguation)
- Pincho
- Pinhoe
- Pinhou
- Pinhão (disambiguation)
- Pino (disambiguation)
