= Dazhou (disambiguation) =

Dazhou (达州市) is a prefecture-level city in the northeast of Sichuan.

Dazhou may also refer to:

== Island ==
- Dazhou Island, in Wanning, Hainan Province, China

== Transport ==
- Dazhou railway station, in Dazhou, Sichuan Province, China
- Dazhou station (Guangzhou Metro), a station on Line 7 (Guangzhou Metro) in Panyu District, Guangzhou, Guangdong Province, China
- Dazhou station (Zhengzhou Metro), a metro station on Zhengxu line (Line 17) of Zhengzhou Metro, located in Xuchang, Henan Province, China

== Towns ==
- Dazhou, Changge (大周镇), in Changge, Xuchang, Henan

Written as "大洲镇":

- Dazhou, Fengkai County, Zhaoqing, Guangdong Province
- Dazhou, Pingnan County, Guangxi
- Dazhou, Quzhou, in Qujiang District, Quzhou, Zhejiang Province

== Township ==
- Dazhou, Pingjiang (大洲乡), a township in Pingjiang County, Hunan Province.

== See also ==
- Zhou (disambiguation)
- Da (disambiguation)
- Daizhou (代州), former Imperial Chinese prefecture
