= DA =

Da, DA, dA and other variants may refer to:

== Arts, entertainment, and media ==
- DA! (band), a Chicago post-punk band of the 1980s
- Da (play), a 1978 play by Hugh Leonard
  - Da (film), a 1988 film based on the play
- Damon Amendolara, American sports talk radio host
- Daniel Amos, also known as D.A. and Dä, an American Christian rock band
- Dennis Armand Lucchesi, who recorded the song "Ready 'n' Steady" under the name "D.A."
- Destination America, American television channel
- DeviantArt or DA, a website that focuses on art
- Dumbledore's Army, a group formed by Harry Potter in his 5th year to teach students defensive spells
- Jon Moxley, formerly Dean Ambrose in WWE, a wrestler
- One Woman's War: Da (Mother), a book about memoirs of a mother during Iran–Iraq War

== Degrees and licenses ==
- Diploma of Anesthesiology, a degree conferred by some medical institutions such as the Royal College of Anaesthetists
- Doctor of Arts, an academic degree

== Organizations ==
- Da!, a Russian youth movement
- Debtors Anonymous
- Donegal Artillery, a reserve unit of Britain's Royal Artillery based in County Donegal, Ireland
- Air Georgia, a Georgian airline (IATA code DA)
- United States Department of the Army, administrative parent of the United States Army

== Politics and judiciary ==
- Da (political party), a defunct Israeli political party
- DA-Notice (Defence Advisory Notice), a former name for a D-Notice, a government request the UK not to publish or broadcast a specified news item for reasons of national security
- Democratic Alliance (South Africa), a South African political party
- Democratic Awakening (Demokratischer Aufbruch), East German political party
- Department of Agriculture (Philippines), an executive department
- Deutsche Alternative ("German Alternative"), a rightist group
- District attorney, (United States) chief prosecutor for a local government area, particularly a county
- Justice and Truth Alliance (Alianța Dreptate și Adevăr), a defunct alliance of parties in Romania

== Places ==
- Da County, a division in Sichuan, China
- DA postcode area, a postcode area in England
- Da River or Black River, a river in China and northwestern Vietnam
- Dah, Ivory Coast, a village in Montagnes District, Ivory Coast, also spelt "Da"

== Science and technology ==
=== Biology and medicine ===
- DA (chemotherapy), standard-dose cytarabine plus daunorubicin
- Deoxyanthocyanidin
- Domoic acid, a neurotoxin produced by phytoplankton
- Dopamine, a monoamine neurotransmitter

=== Other uses in science and technology ===
- Dalton (unit) (symbol Da), also called the unified atomic mass unit
- Deca- or da-, an SI prefix for a factor of 10
- Distribution amplifier, a device that accepts a single input signal and provides this same signal to multiple isolated outputs
- Double-action, a firearm operation mechanism in which the trigger both cocks and releases the hammer
- NZR DA class, a New Zealand diesel locomotive
- SJ Da, a Swedish electric locomotive
- Domain authority Domain Authority

== Sports ==
- U.S. Soccer Development Academy, former United States soccer league

== Other uses ==
- D.A. Wallach (born 1985), American musician and business executive
- Da (Javanese), a syllable in Javanese script
- Da. or Dòna, the honorific Mrs. in Occitan language
- Da Hoss, an American racehorse
- Dame of St Andrew, a discontinued award within the Order of Barbados
- Danish language (ISO 639-1 alpha-2 code DA)
- Dearness allowance, cost of living allowance to government employees in Bangladesh, India, and Pakistan
- Desk accessory, graphical programs
- Direct action (military), in special operations
- Disadvantage, an off-case argument used by the Negative team in a policy debate
- Doomsday argument, a probabilistic argument based on demographics predicting how many people will be born
- Duck's ass or duck's arse, a haircut; particularly popular during the 1950s
- Dynamic game difficulty balancing, also known as difficulty adjustment or DA, an algorithm in video games.
- South Kalimantan (vehicle registration prefix DA)
- Da (Armenian letter)
- Da (Indic)

== See also ==
- Da Da Da (disambiguation)
- Dah (disambiguation)
- The D.A. (disambiguation)
- Boti, a cutting utensil also known as daa
