= Guézon =

Guézon may refer to:

- Guézon, Duékoué, in Duékoué Department, Guémon region, Montagnes District, Ivory Coast
- Guézon, Facobly, in Facobly Department, Guémon region, Montagnes District, Ivory Coast
- Guézon-Tahouaké, in Bangolo Department, Guémon region, Montagnes District, Ivory Coast
