= Zeo =

Zeo may refer to:

- Dodge ZEO, an electric concept car
- Zeos, a home computer company
- Power Rangers Zeo, a television series
- Zope Enterprise Objects, a storage implementation in a Zope Object Database
- Zeo Zagart, a character in the anime television series Beyblade – see List of Beyblade characters § Supporting characters
- Zeo, Inc., a company that made sleep products
- Zamenhof-Esperanto object (ZEO), an object commemorating Esperanto or its creator L. L. Zamenhof
- Zéo, a town and sub-prefecture in Montagnes District, Ivory Coast
- Gardiehbey Zeo (born 1986), a Liberian footballer
