= Blotilé =

- Village
- Location in Ivory Coast
- Coordinates: 7°3′N 7°42′W
- Country: Ivory Coast
- District: Montagnes
- Region: Guémon
- Department: Bangolo
- Sub-prefecture: Zou
- Time zone: UTC+0 (GMT)

Blotilé is a village in western Ivory Coast. It is in the sub-prefecture of Zou, Bangolo Department, Guémon Region, Montagnes District.

Blotilé was a commune until March 2012, when it became one of 1,126 communes nationwide that were abolished.
