= Guézon-Tahouaké =

- Village
- Location in Ivory Coast
- Coordinates: 7°5′N 7°11′W
- Country: Ivory Coast
- District: Montagnes
- Region: Guémon
- Department: Bangolo
- Sub-prefecture: Guinglo-Tahouaké
- Time zone: UTC+0 (GMT)

Guézon-Tahouaké is a village in the western Ivory Coast. It is in the sub-prefecture of Guinglo-Tahouaké, Bangolo Department, Guémon Region, Montagnes District.

Guézon-Tahouaké was a commune until March 2012, when it became one of 1,126 communes nationwide that were abolished.
