= 1954 Cathay Pacific Douglas DC-4 shootdown =

1954 airliner shootdown over the South China Sea

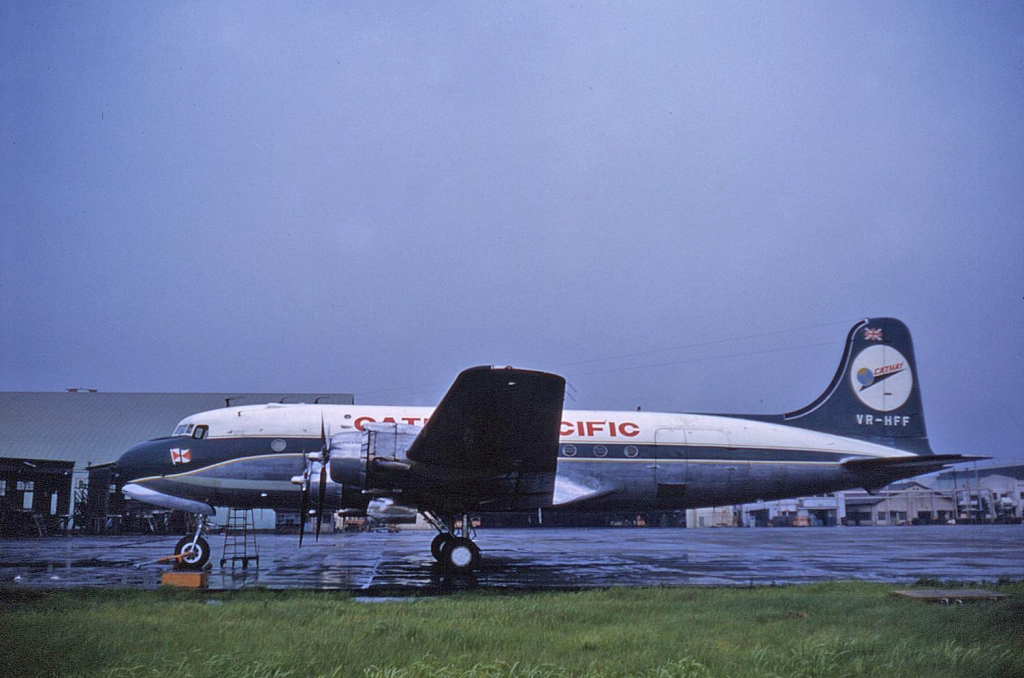
- A Cathay Pacific Douglas DC-4 similar to the aircraft shot down

Accident
- Date: 23 July 1954
- Summary: A civilian C-54 airliner attacked by two PLAAF La-11 fighters and ditched into the sea.
- Site: South China Sea, off the coast of Hainan Island, People's Republic of China.; 19.2°N 110.7°E

Aircraft
- Aircraft type: Douglas C-54A-10-DC Skymaster
- Aircraft name: "Silver Wings"
- Operator: Cathay Pacific Airways
- Registration: VR-HEU, (ex-USAAF 42-72205)
- Flight origin: Bangkok International Airport, Bangkok, Thailand
- Destination: Kai Tak Airport, Hong Kong
- Occupants: 18
- Passengers: 13
- Crew: 5
- Fatalities: 10
- Survivors: 8

The 1954 Cathay Pacific Douglas DC-4 shootdown was an incident on 23 July 1954, when a Cathay Pacific Airways DC-4/C-54 airliner was shot down by a PLA Air Force fighter aircraft. The event occurred off the coast of Hainan Island, where the plane was en route from Bangkok to Hong Kong, killing 10 of 18 passengers and crew on board. The crew of five was headed by British captain Phil Blown. In all, one flight crew member, one cabin crew member and eight of the thirteen passengers were killed in the attack and subsequent crash of the airliner.

Although the aircraft was originally manufactured for the United States Army Air Forces (USAAF) as a Douglas C-54 Skymaster, it was subsequently converted to civilian airliner standard, and sold firstly to KLM, and later to Cathay Pacific. Hence the incident is known as "the DC-4 shootdown", to acknowledge that the aircraft was no longer a C-54, and that it was not being used for military purposes.

== Aircraft ==
The aircraft, registered VR-HEU, was a four-engine, propeller-driven Douglas C-54A Skymaster airliner.

The aircraft had been manufactured by Douglas Aircraft and delivered to the USAAF on 16 May 1944, where it served for less than two years. It was bought on 19 February 1946 by KLM and first operated by KLM West Indies before returning to KLM main line in February 1948. It was sold to Cathay Pacific in August 1949.

== Flight and attack ==
The flight originated in Singapore.

On 22 July 1954, VR-HEU took off from Bangkok at 20:19 GMT after being delayed in Bangkok for an hour due to mechanical problems on its No. 2 engine. The flight was bound for Hong Kong.

At 23:40 GMT, when the DC-4 was cruising at 9,000 ft (2,700 m) and roughly 10 miles (16 km) east of the international air corridor line off Hainan Island and only 31 minutes from Hong Kong, two Lavochkin La-11 fighters of the 85th Fighter Regiment, 29th Fighter Division, People's Liberation Army Air Force (PLAAF), appeared behind VR-HEU, one above it on the DC-4's starboard rear side and the other on its port side. At approximately 23:44 GMT, the fighters opened fire, hitting the two outboard engines (numbers 1 and 4) which caught fire. The number 4 engine's auxiliary and main fuel tanks were also ablaze.

While captain Phil Blown took evasive actions to avoid further damage, co-pilot Cedric Carlton issued blankets to passengers instructing them to place them on the back of their seats for protection against the bullets. Radio operator Stephen Wong made an initial distress call at 23:45 GMT: "Kai Tak Tower, Cathay XXX, Mayday! Mayday! Mayday! No. 1 port engine on fire, losing altitude, requesting all possible assistance." Wong made 10 mayday calls before VR-HEU ditched. Cathay Pacific engineer G. H. Cattanach, travelling as a passenger, tried to make the passengers comfortable when it became known that the plane was going to ditch.

VR-HEU began losing altitude and at 5,000-foot (1,500 m), its rudder control was shot off. Travelling at 350 miles per hour (560 km/h; 300 kn), Blown tried his utmost to evade incendiary bullets fired by the fighters by taking evasive action, weaving the Skymaster left and right. At 2,000-foot (610 m), the right aileron was shot off and the plane began uncontrollably turning right. The captain then countered the increasing turn by shutting down engines 1 and 2 and applying full power on engine 3. Approximately two minutes after the initial attack, unable to maintain controlled levelled flight, Blown decided to ditch the Skymaster in rough open seas that included 15-foot (5 m) waves and a 25-knot (13 m/s) wind.

The starboard wingtip was the first to hit the water, severing the right wing between the number 3 and 4 engines. The impact caused the tail to break off and float off 50 yards (46 m) from the main wreckage. The main fuselage now floated at an angle of 45 degrees with the rear open fuselage pointing towards the sky.

After the plane ditched into the ocean, the attacking fighters, flying at around 1,000-foot (300 m), ceased firing at the Skymaster, made a turn around the wreckage, and headed towards Sanya. While nine passengers and crew were killed by bullets and the subsequent ditching, nine others survived and escaped from the sinking plane. Blown and his co-pilot escaped through a broken starboard sliding window, which had water coming in fast.

With all survivors floating on the water with no life vests, co-pilot Carlton suddenly noticed that a Mrs Thorburn was hanging on to a raft still in its case. Fearing the bright yellow rubber raft might attract the attention of PLAAF fighters, it took Carlton twenty minutes to finally inflate the rubber dinghy and lift all nine passengers in. Once all were on the dinghy, concern remained that the attacking planes might return; some of the dazed, injured passengers, with their clothes in shreds, hid under a plastic sunshade covering the edges of the dinghy. Although Blown and passenger Peter Thacher kept watch, the attacking planes never returned.

== Rescue efforts ==
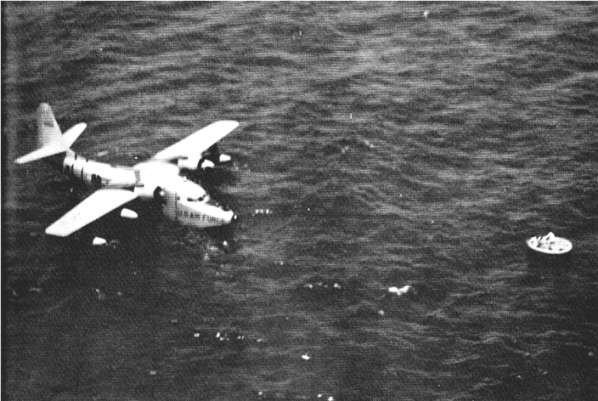
US Air Force SA-16 rescuing survivors

An Air Vietnam plane en route to Hong Kong from Hanoi, which had altered its course as a results of the calls, spotted the sinking plane and a dinghy one and a half miles (2.4 km) from the Hainan coast. It circled for forty minutes before heading for Hong Kong. Thanks to those calls, the RAF in Hong Kong immediately redirected a Saigon-bound Vickers Valetta military transport and further despatched a Short Sunderland flying boat and an Avro York military transport, as well as two de Havilland Hornet fighters of 80 Squadron, from RAF Kai Tak to the reported position of the C-54. A fully armed French PB4Y-2 Privateer also took off from Tourane (Da Nang), French Indochina (now Vietnam) after intercepting the emergency radio call.

Meanwhile, the civilian-operated Manila rescue control centre in the Philippines, on picking up the SOS call from Wong, alerted the 31st Air Rescue Squadron of the USAF at Clark Air Force Base. Captain Jack T. Woodyard, on first alert duty that day and about to depart on a routine training mission in his Grumman SA-16 Albatross, 51-009, immediately took off. A second Albatross followed Woodyard 35 minutes later.

The Hornets were the first to arrive on the scene, followed by the Valetta, Sunderland, York and the Privateer. While the Hornets carried out a thorough search of the area for survivors, the French Privateer informed the Albatross, which was 50 miles (80 km) away, "We have spotted the dinghy with survivors; looks like two of them from here." The British and American planes were not able to communicate with each other as they were on different radio frequencies.

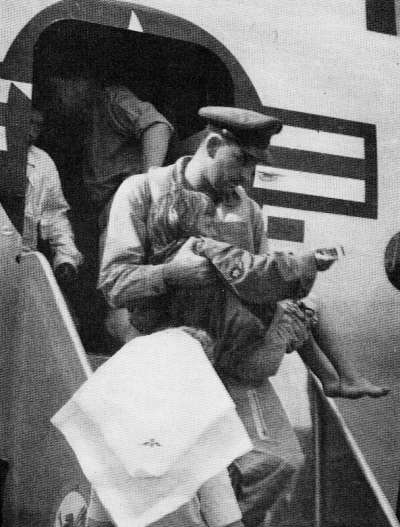
Captain Woodyard carries six-year-old Valerie off the plane

Captain Blown, on seeing the Sunderland arrive, tossed a packet of green sea dye overboard to make the dinghy easier to spot. The Sunderland acknowledged this by setting off a smoke flare but, unable to land in the atrocious conditions, had to circle helplessly for two hours until Woodyard's Albatross finally arrived; this too circled for an hour before landing on the calmer side of Dazhou Island, where it taxied towards the dinghy in rough water before pulling all survivors on board and taking off for Hong Kong, escorted by the Sunderland. AAP and Reuters reported at the time that three survivors were picked up by the Sunderland.

The last passenger to be hoisted on board was the badly injured Rita Cheung, who had broken her left leg in two places and had suffered a deep gash on her forehead. She died aboard the rescue aircraft, ten minutes before the plane reached Kai Tak.

Radio operator Stephen Wong was also killed. It is believed his head was impaled on a drift meter during the ditching of the airliner.

== Theories for the attack ==
There were several hypotheses for the attack, which included:

- VR-HEU was carrying a Chinese Nationalist ambassador;
- The United States Ambassador to Thailand, "Wild Bill" Donovan, former head of the OSS (the forerunner of CIA) was to have traveled on a Civil Air Transport plane that same week.

The official explanation from Beijing was that the Cathay Pacific airliner was mistaken as a Republic of China plane on a mission to raid a military base at Port Yulin on Hainan Island.

== Aftermath ==
On 26 July 1954, during the survivor search operation, two Douglas A-1 Skyraiders of VA-54 from the aircraft carrier USS Philippine Sea shot down two PLAAF La-7s off the coast of Hainan Island. It is not known whether they were the same La-11s that had shot down VR-HEU.

The shooting down of VR-HEU raised tension between the People's Republic of China, Britain and the US. The British Foreign Office, through its chargé d'affaires in Peking, Humphrey Trevelyan, delivered Britain's protest to Communist China two days later. The US Secretary of State, John Foster Dulles, issued a sharp statement condemning the attack, saying the United States took "the gravest view of the act of further barbarity and that the Chinese Communist regime must be held responsible."

The shootdown probably harmed the PRC's chances of admission into the United Nations. Republican Senator H. Alexander Smith of New Jersey interrupted a marathon debate in the US Senate over atomic legislation to read Mr. Dulles's statement before calling the situation "critical". Minnesota Republican Representative Walter Judd, a member of the House Foreign Affairs Committee, expressed the view that the incident was another reason why Communist China must not be admitted to the United Nations.

The PRC admitted responsibility three days later by apologising and making compensation to Cathay Pacific and the victims.

Phil Blown, who had been in command of VR-HEU at the time it was shot down, was hailed as a hero. He continued flying for Cathay Pacific for three to four years after the incident, and then retired to New South Wales, Australia, where he died in a nursing home in September 2009, aged 96.

== See also ==
- List of airliner shootdown incidents
- Kashmir Princess
