= 29th Fighter Division =

- 第29歼击机师
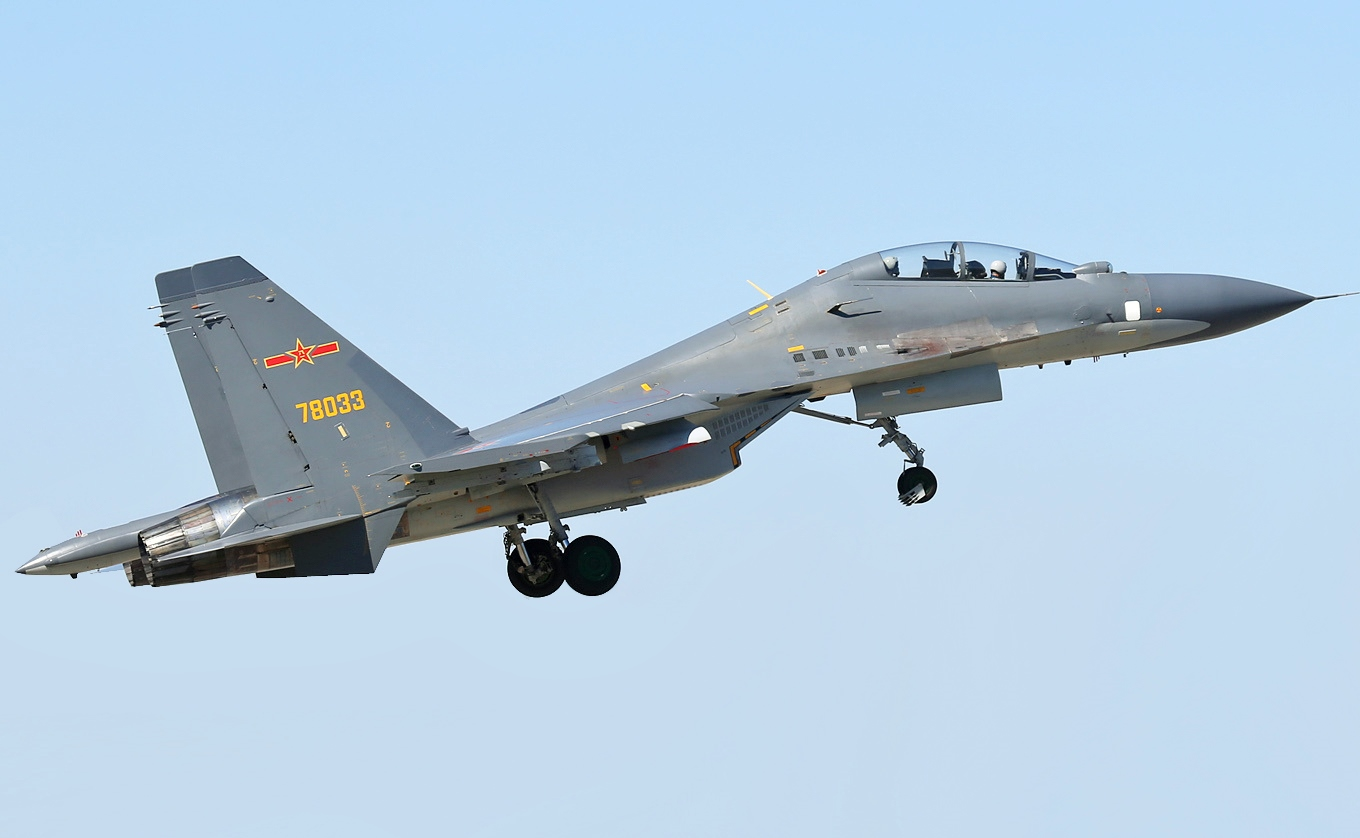
- A PLAAF Su-30MKK like those used by the 29th FD
- Active: 17 December 1953–c.2019
- Country: People's Republic of China
- Branch: People's Liberation Army Air Force
- Type: Fixed wing aviation
- Size: Air division
- Part of: Fuzhou Base, Eastern Theater Command Air Force, Eastern Theater Command
- Garrison/HQ: Quzhou Air Base, Quzhou, Zhejiang, People's Republic of China
- Engagements: First Taiwan Strait Crisis; Battle of Yijiangshan Islands; 1954 Cathay Pacific DC-4 shootdown

Commanders
- Current commander: Xu Xueqiang (as of 2019)

Aircraft flown
- Interceptor: Sukhoi Su-30MKK; Chengdu J-7H; Shenyang J-8B

The 29th Fighter Division (29th FD, Chinese: 第29歼击机师; pinyin: Dì 29 Jiānjíjī Shī), also called the 29th Air Division was a fighter division of the Chinese People's Liberation Army Air Force (PLAAF) based in Quzhou, Zhejiang province. Headquartered at Quzhou Air Base, the unit was under the control of the Eastern Theater Command Air Force. The 29th operated Sukhoi Su-30MKK, Chengdu J-7H, and Shenyang J-8B aircraft in support of air operations in the East China Sea and Taiwan Strait. As of 2019, the division commander was Xu Xueqiang. Since the near complete abolition of divisions from the PLA command structure around 2017, the previously subordinate 85th and 87th Fighter Regiments of the 29th FD survived as the 85th and 78th Fighter Brigades, respectively.

== History ==
In accordance with a telegram issued by the Central Military Commission on 15 December 1953, and 17 December, the 29th Fighter Division was formally established in Jiaxing, Zhejiang Province on the basis of the 71st Division of the PLA Ground Force and a regiment drawn from the Air Force of the East China Military Region. The division subsequently assumed control over the 85th Fighter Regiment, formerly the 4th regiment of the 2nd Air Division, and the 87th Air Regiment, equipped with 25 Lavochkin La-11 fighter aircraft between them.

On 22 July 1954, 11 pilots of the 85th Regiment of the 29th Fighter Division, led by deputy commander Wang Tianbao, arrived at Haikou Airport, Hainan Island to escort Soviet oil tankers Leningrad and Batumi Mi from Hainan to Guangzhou's Huangpu Port. This was the first time that PLAAF forces were stationed on Hainan. On 26 July, two La 11's of the PLAAF escorted the Soviet Polish oil tanker "Peace" and other merchant ships. Five groups of 24 U.S. Navy fighter aircraft invaded the sky over Dazhou Island in the southeast of Hainan Island. At 10:05, 12 fighter jets launched an attack on the La-11s over the sea area east of Bei'ao Port. Lead pilot Zhou Zhendong and his wingman were both killed in the counterattack. The U.S. plane then reportedly fired on the escort ship. After the escort ship fired back, the American aircraft left the area. In August 1954, the unit was responsible for air support to the Chinese invasion of the Yijiangshan Islands.

On 10 March 1955, the unit was ordered to be transferred to the North China Military Region Air Force. The unit officially moved 1 April 1955, stationed at Liuting Airport in Shandong Province. On 4 August 1959, the unit moved to Xuzhou Airport, in Jiangsu province. The division officially became part of the People's Liberation Army Air Force on 1 July 1956. On 17 November 1968, the 12th Air Division and the 29th Air Division were transferred to the People's Liberation Army. The 12th Air Division, based at Quzhou and Jianqiao Airports moved to Xuzhou and Baitabu Airports, while the 29th Air Division was transferred to Quzhou and Jianqiao in Guangdong. On 29 September 1977, the 86th Regiment of the 29th Air Division was transferred from Jiaxing to Liancheng.

By around 2010, the 29th Fighter Division's three aviation regiments were each equipped with between 19 and 28 Sukhoi Su-30MKK, as well as Chengdu J-7H, and Shenyang J-8B aircraft, providing the unit a combat radius of 1,500 km. While based at Quzhou, the 29th was 500 km from Taipei, and reportedly tasked primarily with achieving air superiority over the city when the Chinese attack on Taiwan began.

Fighters of the 29th Fighter Division were identifiable by their tail numbers, all having number '2' as the initial digit, and '0' as the penultimate digit.

- 85th Aviation Regiment (空85旅) at Quzhou Air Base last operated Sukhoi Su-30MKK, tail numbers 2xx0x–2xx0x
- 86th Aviation Regiment (空86旅) at Quzhou Air Base last operated Chengdu J-7D fighters, tail numbers 2xx0x–2xx0x
- 87th Aviation Regiment (空87旅) at Quzhou Air Base last operated Shenyang J-8B and J-8D fighters, tail numbers 2xx0x–2xx0x

== Reorganization and brigadization ==
In November 2011, the 29th Fighter Division began the PLA-wide program eliminating divisions in favor of brigades. The resulting brigades now report directly to the Eastern Theater Command Air Force under Eastern Theater Command (Nanjing Military Region prior to the 2015 military reforms). These units operate as follows:

- 85th Fighter Brigade (空85旅) at Quzhou Air Base, Quzhou, Zhejiang operates Sukhoi Su-30MKK, tail numbers from 69x6x.
  - previously the 85th Aviation Regiment, 29th AD
- 78th Fighter Brigade (空78旅) at Chongming Airport, Chongming District, Shanghai operates the Shenyang J-8DF, tail numbers from 68x9x.
  - previously the 87th Aviation Regiment, 29th AD

In 2004, the original 86th Regiment of the 29th FD was transferred to the 41st Fighter Regiment of the 14th Fighter Division, equipped with Shenyang J-11 and Sukhoi Su-27UBK fighter aircraft. The regiment recovered its previous number during the switch from regiments to brigades in 2012, becoming the 86th Fighter Brigade.

== Shootdown of commercial airliner ==
At 23:40 GMT 23 July 1954, a Douglas C-54 Skymaster of Cathay Pacific Airways en route to Hong Kong Kai Tak Airport was flying at 9,000 ft (2,700 m) roughly 10 miles (16 km) off Hainan Island when two La-11 fighters of the 85th Fighter Regiment, 29th Fighter Division, appeared behind the aircraft on either side. At approximately 23:44 GMT, the fighters opened fire, hitting the two outboard engines (numbers 1 and 4), forcing the crew to ditch the aircraft into 15 foot (3 m) waves. Between the impact of the ditching, drownings, and gunfire from the La-11s, 10 of the 19 passengers and crew on board were killed. Lead La-11 pilot Zhao Xu was eventually sentenced to one year in prison, while wingman Han Guangrong served one month confinement.

== Accidents ==
- On 20 September 1954, a Lavochkin La-11 of the 87th Regiment, 29th FD suffered a first-class accident, stalled, and crashed following a failed emergency landing.
- On 30 June 1955, a Lavochkin La-11 of the 86th Regiment, 29th FD suffered a first-class accident, stalled and crashed.
- On 19 August 1964, a Mikoyan-Gurevich MiG-15bis of the 29th FD Independent Brigade suffered a first-class accident.
- On 14 April 1965, a Shenyang J-5 of the 85th Battalion, 29th FD suffered a second-class accident and made an emergency landing.
- On 12 June 1969, a Shenyang J-6 of the 85th Regiment, 29th FD suffered a first-class accident, stalled and crashed.
- On 25 June 1971, a Shenyang J-6 of the 86th Regiment, 29th FD suffered a first-class accident after the starboard engine failed and an emergency landing was unsuccessful.
- On 22 May 1972, a Shenyang J-6 of the 86th Regiment, 29th FD suffered a first-class accident as a result of pilot error following an anomaly during take-off.
- On 7 March 1979, a Shenyang/Tianjin JJ-6 two seat trainer piloted by Xu Zhendong, then commander of the 29th Air Division and training pilot Guo Qingfa, suffered an uncontrolled decompression after the rear section of the canopy blew off, causing a catastrophic loss of control and crash which killed both.
- On 27 April 1998, two Chengdu J-7D's of the 29th FD collided and crashed during night flight training. The pilot of the lead plane (25106) ejected and escaped, while the pilot of the wingman (25007) died.
