= Piñones =

Piñones may refer to:

- The seeds of the tree genus Araucaria
- Piñones State Forest, Puerto Rico
- Battle of Puerto de Piñones, a battle of the War of Mexican Independence
- Pablo Piñones Arce (born 1981), Swedish footballer

== See also ==
- Piñon
