= DAHS =

DAHS may refer to:

- Dallastown Area High School, Dallastown, Pennsylvania, United States
- Dame Alice Harpur School, Bedford, England
- Division Avenue High School, Levittown, New York, United States

== See also ==
- Dah (disambiguation)
