= Guékpé =

- Village
- Location in Ivory Coast
- Coordinates: 7°12′N 7°24′W
- Country: Ivory Coast
- District: Montagnes
- Region: Guémon
- Department: Bangolo
- Sub-prefecture: Béoué-Zibiao
- Time zone: UTC+0 (GMT)

Guékpé is a village in western Ivory Coast. It is in the sub-prefecture of Béoué-Zibiao, Bangolo Department, Guémon Region, Montagnes District.

Guékpé was a commune until March 2012, when it became one of 1,126 communes nationwide that were abolished.
