= Pinyan =

Pinyan is a surname and occasionally a given name.

Notable people with the surname include:

- Kenneth Pinyan (1960–2005), American engineer; died as a result of the Enumclaw horse sex case
- Zion Pinyan (born 1951), Israeli politician, member of the Knesset for Likud

People with the given name Pinyan include:

- Liu Pinyan (born 1988), Taiwanese musician, member of Mandopop girl group Sweety

== See also ==
- Pinon (disambiguation)
- Pinyin
- Kenneth D. Pinyan
