= European U18 Beach Volleyball Championships =

International beach volleyball competition

European U18 Beach Volleyball Championships is a double-gender beach volleyball tournament for national U18 teams. It is organised annually by the European Volleyball Confederation (CEV).

== Editions ==
European U18 Beach Volleyball Championships
#	Date	Host
1	15–18 August 2002	Illichivsk, UKR
2	07-10 August 2003	Brno, CZE
3	05-08 August 2004	Mysłowice, POL
4	11–14 August 2005	Illichivsk, UKR
5	27–30 July 2006	Bratislava, SVK
6	18–21 July 2007	Brno, CZE
7	28–31 August 2008	Loutraki, GRE
8	23–26 July 2009	Espinho, POR
9	05-08 August 2010	Porto, POR
10	11–14 August 2011	Vilnius, LTU
11	05-08 July 2012	BrnoCZE
12	28–31 August 2013	Maladzyechna, BLR
13	21–24 August 2014	Kristiansand, NOR
14	06-09 August 2015	Rīga, LAT
15	11–14 August 2016	Brno, CZE
16	24–27 August 2017	Kazan, RUS
17	16–19 August 2018	Brno, CZE
18	13–16 June 2019	Baden, AUT
19	16–20 September 2020	İzmir, TUR
20	02-05 September 2021	Ljubljana, SLO
21	01-04 September 2022	Loutraki, GRE
22	23–27 August 2023	Madrid, ESP
24	10–14 July 2024	Kachreti, GEO
25	11–14 September 2025	Schiavonea, ITA
26	17–20 September 2026	Foça, TUR

- 2020: Originally planned on 08-12 July but postponed due to the COVID-19 pandemic.

== Results ==
Men's Tournament
Year	Champions	Final	Runners-up	Third place
2002	RUS	2:1	ESP	RUS
2003	GER	2:0	LAT	ESP
2004	POL	2:0	GER	POL
2005	POL	2:0	LTU	SLO
2006	POL	2:0	UKR	FRA
2007	EST	2:1	ESP	FRA
2008	UKR	2:1	POL	GER
2009	POL	2:0	CRO	EST
2010	RUS	2:0	POL	RUS
2011	POL	2:0	RUS	POL
2012	RUS	2:0	RUS	GER
2013	RUS	2:0	AUT	GER
2014	GER	2:1	POL	ESP
2015	FRA	2:0	UKR	SUI
2016	GER	2:0	RUS	FRA
2017	RUS	2:0	RUS	RUS
2018	SWE	2:0	CZE	RUS
2019	GER	2:1	SLO	RUS
2020	UKR	2:0	LAT	RUS
2021	RUS	2:0	POL	AUT
2022	LAT	2:0	DEN	BEL
2023	DEN	2:1	SWE	GER
2024	ITA	2:1	GER	LAT
2025	GER	2:0	UKR	ITA
2026	AUT	2:0	FRA	GER

Women's Tournament
Year	Champions	Final	Runners-up	Third place
2002	GER	2:1	NED	GRE
2003	GER	2:0	GER	NED
2004	POL	2:1	GER	GER
2005	CZE	2:0	GER	LTU
2006	NED	2:1	NED	GER
2007	GER	2:1	FRA	SUI
2008	RUS	2:0	GER	POL
2009	GER	2:1	CZE	RUS
2010	RUS	2:0	POR	GER
2011	LTU	2:1	SUI	POL
2012	POL	2:0	GER	SUI
2013	RUS	2:0	GER	UKR
2014	GER	2:0	POL	FIN
2015	LAT	2:0	AUT	CZE
2016	CZE	2:1	RUS	SRB
2017	RUS	2:1	NED	UKR
2018	GER	2:0	RUS	ESP
2019	RUS	2:1	ESP	CZE
2020	UKR	2:0	UKR	SUI
2021	SUI	2:1	UKR	GER
2022	CZE	2:0	AUT	NED
2023	ESP	2:1	AUT	FRA
2024	AUT	2:1	SUI	GER
2025	GRE	2:0	GER	BEL
2026	NED	2:0	UKR	GER

== Medals ==
=== Men (2002–2026) ===
Rank	Nation	Gold	Silver	Bronze	Total
1	Russia	6	4	6	16
2	Poland	5	4	2	11
3	Germany	5	2	6	13
4	Ukraine	2	3	0	5
5	Latvia	1	2	1	4
6	France	1	1	3	5
7	Austria	1	1	1	3
8	Denmark	1	1	0	2
8	Sweden	1	1	0	2
10	Estonia	1	0	1	2
11	Italy	1	0	0	1
12	Spain	0	2	2	4
13	Slovenia	0	1	1	2
14	Croatia	0	1	0	1
14	Czech Republic	0	1	0	1
14	Lithuania	0	1	0	1
17	Belgium	0	0	1	1
17	Switzerland	0	0	1	1
Totals (18 entries)		25	25	25	75

=== Women (2002–2026) ===
Rank	Nation	Gold	Silver	Bronze	Total
1	Germany	6	7	6	19
2	Russia	5	2	1	8
3	Czech Republic	3	1	2	6
4	Netherlands	2	4	2	8
5	Poland	2	1	2	5
6	Austria	1	3	0	4
7	Switzerland	1	2	3	6
8	Ukraine	1	2	2	5
9	Spain	1	1	1	3
10	Greece	1	0	1	2
10	Lithuania	1	0	1	2
12	Latvia	1	0	0	1
13	France	0	1	1	2
14	Portugal	0	1	0	1
15	Belgium	0	0	1	1
15	Finland	0	0	1	1
15	Serbia	0	0	1	1
Totals (17 entries)		25	25	25	75

=== Total (2002–2026) ===
Rank	Nation	Gold	Silver	Bronze	Total
1	Germany	11	9	11	31
2	Russia	11	6	7	24
3	Poland	7	5	4	16
4	Ukraine	3	6	2	11
5	Czech Republic	3	2	2	7
6	Austria	2	4	1	7
7	Netherlands	2	3	2	7
8	Latvia	2	2	1	5
9	France	1	2	4	7
9	Switzerland	1	2	4	7
11	Estonia	1	2	3	6
12	Lithuania	1	1	1	3
12	Spain	1	1	1	3
14	Denmark	1	1	0	2
14	Sweden	1	1	0	2
16	Greece	1	0	1	2
16	Italy	1	0	1	2
18	Slovenia	0	1	1	2
19	Croatia	0	1	0	1
19	Portugal	0	1	0	1
21	Belgium	0	0	2	2
22	Finland	0	0	1	1
22	Serbia	0	0	1	1
Totals (23 entries)		50	50	50	150
