= The D.A. =

The D.A. may refer to:

- The D.A. (1971 TV series), an NBC TV series starring Robert Conrad and Harry Morgan
- The D.A. (2004 TV series), an ABC TV series starring Steven Weber

== See also ==
- DA (disambiguation)
