= Soaékpé-Douédy =

- Village
- Location in Ivory Coast
- Coordinates: 7°22′N 7°19′W
- Country: Ivory Coast
- District: Montagnes
- Region: Guémon
- Department: Facobly
- Sub-prefecture: Guézon
- Time zone: UTC+0 (GMT)

Soaékpé-Douédy is a village in western Ivory Coast. It is in the sub-prefecture of Guézon, Facobly Department, Guémon Region, Montagnes District.

Soaékpé-Douédy was a commune until March 2012, when it became one of 1,126 communes nationwide that were abolished.
