= Diéouzon =

- Town and sub-prefecture
- Location in Ivory Coast
- Coordinates: 7°9′N 7°20′W
- Country: Ivory Coast
- District: Montagnes
- Region: Guémon
- Department: Bangolo

Population (2014)
  - Total: 31,009
- Time zone: UTC+0 (GMT)

Diéouzon is a town in western Ivory Coast. It is a sub-prefecture of Bangolo Department in Guémon Region, Montagnes District.

Diéouzon was a commune until March 2012, when it became one of 1,126 communes nationwide that were abolished.

In 2014, the population of the sub-prefecture of Diéouzon was 31,009.

== Villages ==
The six villages of the sub-prefecture of Diéouzon and their population in 2014 are:

1. Baibly (12,357)
2. Bouobly (1,917)
3. Diéouzon (4,999)
4. Douékpé (4,252)
5. Gonié-Tahouaké (6,429)
6. Sébazon (1,055)
