= Pinon =

Pinon, Piñon, Piñón, or Pinyon may refer to:

- Pinyon pine (piñon pine), a group of several species of North American pine trees (genus Pinus)
  - Pinyon-juniper woodland, a biome
  - the edible pine nuts of pinyon pine trees
- Araucaria nut, edible seeds of Araucaria trees
  - the edible seeds of the South American evergreen Araucaria araucana
  - the edible seeds of the South American evergreen Araucaria angustifolia
- Pastelón, a traditional Puerto Rican layered casserole

== People ==
- Dominique Pinon (born 1955), French actor
- Pinon (Edom), a minor Old Testament figure

== Places ==
- Pinon, Aisne, a commune of the Aisne department in France
- Piñon, Arizona, United States
- Piñon, New Mexico, United States
- Piñon Canyon Maneuver Site, a large military base in Colorado
- Piñon, Montrose County, an unincorporated area in Colorado

== See also ==
- Piñones
- Pinyan
- Pinhão
