= Daha =

Daha or DAHA may refer to:

== Places ==
=== India ===
- Daha, Karnal, a village in Karnal district of Haryana state of India
- Daha, Bagpat, India

=== Nepal ===
- Daha, Bheri, Nepal
- Daha, Karnali, Nepal

=== Other places ===
- Daha (modern Kediri, East Java), the capital of Kediri Kingdom in East Java

== Other uses ==
- DAHA, the abbreviation for double affine Hecke algebra
- Daha ("More"), a 2017 Turkish film, directed by Onur Saylak
- Macro-Daha languages of South America
- Daha (clan), community and surname in Pakistan

== See also ==
- Dah (disambiguation)
