= Gohouo-Zagna =

- Town and sub-prefecture
- Location in Ivory Coast
- Coordinates: 7°3′N 7°26′W
- Country: Ivory Coast
- District: Montagnes
- Region: Guémon
- Department: Bangolo

Population (2014)
  - Total: 17,800
- Time zone: UTC+0 (GMT)

Gohouo-Zagna is a town in western Ivory Coast. It is a sub-prefecture of Bangolo Department in Guémon Region, Montagnes District.

Gohouo-Zagna was a commune until March 2012, when it became one of 1,126 communes nationwide that were abolished.

In 2014, the population of the sub-prefecture of Gohouo-Zagna was 17,800.

== Villages ==
The three villages of the sub-prefecture of Gohouo-Zagna and their population in 2014 are:

1. Glodé (719)
2. Gohouo-Zagna (16,836)
3. Tié-Iné-Zagna (245)
