= Zou, Ivory Coast =

Zou
- Town and sub-prefecture
- Location in Ivory Coast
- Coordinates: 6°59′N 7°48′W
- Country: Ivory Coast
- District: Montagnes
- Region: Guémon
- Department: Bangolo

Area
  - Total: 444 km^{2} (171 sq mi)

Population (2021 census)
  - Total: 52,864
  - Density: 119/km^{2} (308/sq mi)
  - Town: 19,448
- (2014 census)
- Time zone: UTC+0 (GMT)

Zou is a town in western Ivory Coast. It is a sub-prefecture of Bangolo Department in Guémon Region, Montagnes District.

Latitude: 6.98333, Longitude: -7.8

6° 58′ 60″ North, 7° 48′ 0″ West

Zou was a commune until March 2012, when it became one of 1,126 communes nationwide that were abolished.

In 2021, the population of the sub-prefecture of Zou was 52,864.

== Villages ==
The 14 villages of the sub-prefecture of Zou and their population in 2014 are:

1. Bably (7 ,52)
2. Béoua-Zarabaon (971)
3. Blotilé (4,414)
4. Diédrou (8,107)
5. Douanzéré (1,232)
6. Gan (1,167)
7. Gohouo-Zarabaon (4,752)
8. Gouétilé (3,235)
9. Koulaéoué (6,674)
10. Phing (2,247)
11. Tionlé (5,407)
12. Zérégbo (9,515)
13. Zodry (791)
14. Zou (19,448)
