= Dah, Ivory Coast =

Dah Da
- Village
- Location in Ivory Coast
- Coordinates: 6°59′N 7°33′W
- Country: Ivory Coast
- District: Montagnes
- Region: Guémon
- Department: Bangolo
- Sub-prefecture: Bangolo
- Time zone: UTC+0 (GMT)

Dah (also spelled Da) is a village in western Ivory Coast. It is in the sub-prefecture of Bangolo, Bangolo Department, Guémon Region, Montagnes District.

From 2008 to 2012, Dah was in the commune of Dah-Zagna. In March 2012, Dah-Zagna became one of 1,126 communes nationwide that were abolished.
