= Bléniméouin =

Bléniméouin Bléni-Wé-Wen
- Town and sub-prefecture
- Location in Ivory Coast
- Coordinates: 7°8′N 7°11′W
- Country: Ivory Coast
- District: Montagnes
- Region: Guémon
- Department: Bangolo

Population (2014)
  - Total: 21,927
- Time zone: UTC+0 (GMT)

Bléniméouin (also spelled Bléni-Wé-Win) is a town in western Ivory Coast. It is a sub-prefecture of Bangolo Department in Guémon Region, Montagnes District.

Bléniméouin was a commune until March 2012, when it became one of 1,126 communes nationwide that were abolished.

In 2014, the population of the sub-prefecture of Bléniméouin was 23,979.

== Villages ==
The three villages of the sub-prefecture of Bléniméouin and their population in 2014 are:

1. Bléniméouin (15,189)
2. Diébly (3,494)
3. Zaodrou (5,296)
