= Quzhou Airport =

Quzhou Airport 衢州机场

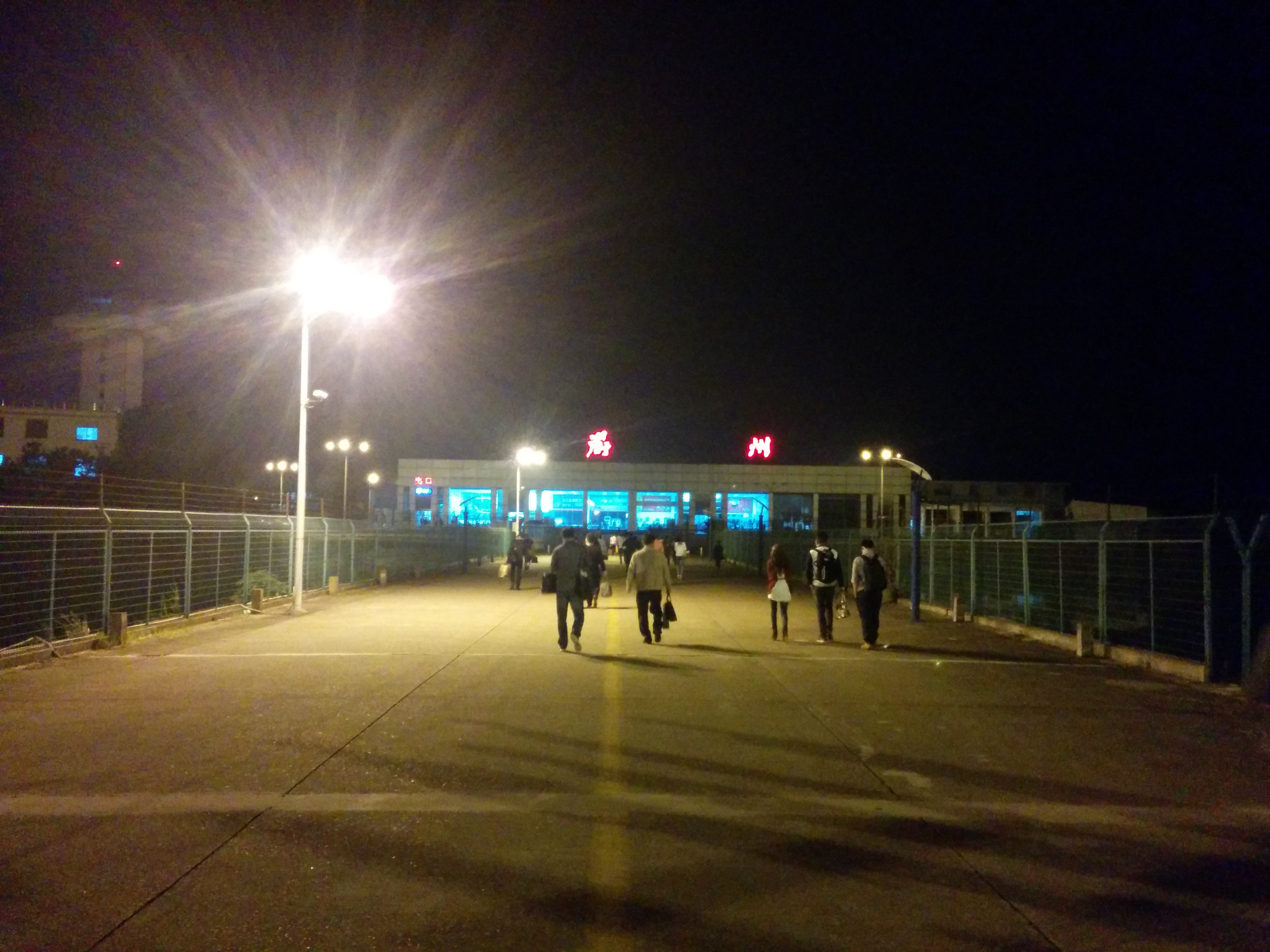
- Quzhou's civilian terminal from the causeway, with the air traffic control tower to the far left
- IATA: JUZ; ICAO: ZSJU; WMO: 58633

Summary
- Airport type: Military/Public
- Owner: PLA Air Force
- Serves: Quzhou, Zhejiang, China
- Opened: 26 November 1993; 32 years ago
- Built: c.1933
- In use: c.1933–present
- Occupants: 85th Fighter Brigade
- Time zone: (UTC+08:00)
- Elevation AMSL: 65 m (213 ft)
- Coordinates: 28°57′57″N 118°53′58″E
- Website: mhj.qz.gov.cn

Map
- Location of airport in Zhejiang

Runways
Direction	Length		Surface
Direction	m	ft	Surface
06/24	2,500	8,202	Concrete

Statistics (2025)
- Passengers: 1,111,124 ▲7.3%
- Aircraft movements: 10,853 ▼4.5%
- Cargo (metric tons): 725.3 ▼11.8%
- Source:CAAC

Quzhou Airport
- Simplified Chinese: 衢州机场
- Traditional Chinese: 衢州機場
Transcriptions
Standard Mandarin
- Hanyu Pinyin: Qúzhōu Jīchǎng

Quzhou Airport, also called Quzhou Air Base (IATA: JUZ, ICAO: ZSJU) is a dual-use military and civil airport located 2.9 kilometers east of the city of Quzhou in Zhejiang Province, China. Originally only a military airfield for the People's Liberation Army Air Force, the airport was first expanded for use by American bombers during World War II, and was later occupied by Japanese troops. A small passenger terminal opened to commercial flights on 26 November 1993, though expanded commercial use of the airport has been hampered by continued heavy military presence due to the airport's proximity to the East China Sea and Taiwan Strait. Airlines operating out of Quzhou Airport generally operate medium to large narrow-body aircraft, such as the Boeing 737. Quzhou's commercial passenger terminal is unique in being separated from the airport's two aircraft bays by a lake, requiring passengers to walk across a lengthy causeway before boarding. The airport serves as the base of operations for regional carrier Quzhou Airlines.

== History ==
=== World War II ===
Originally known as Hangzhou Air Base, in 1937 the facility was renamed Quzhou Air Base. Following the Japanese attack on Pearl Harbor in the winter of 1941, the airport began a major expansion for future use by United States Army Air Forces. The airport's strategic location played a key role in World War II, with American aircraft frequenting the base for replenishment. In April 1942 the base was to serve as the refueling point for the Doolittle Raiders following the strike on Tokyo, however because of incliment weather, all of them ran out of fuel prior to reaching the base, instead crash landing around the city of Quzhou. Chinese support from Quzhou drove the Japanese to launch the battle of Zhejiang and Jiangxi to suppress the airbase, with Japanese troops taking control of the base on June 3, 1942.

=== First Taiwan Strait Crisis ===
In the early hours of June 23, 1956, Lu Min, then-commander of the 34th Regiment, 12th Air Division of the PLAAF, took off from Quzhou Airport with a MiG-17 fighter jet and shot down a Republic of China Air Force B-17 Flying Fortress over the Guangfeng and Shangrao areas of Jiangxi province, marking the first time PLAAF air defenses managed to shoot down an enemy at night.

On April 27, 1998, during a night flight training exercise of J-7D fighter jets by the 29th Air Division at Quzhou Airport in Zhejiang Province, two aircraft collided and crashed. The pilot of the lead aircraft (25106) successfully ejected, while the pilot of the wingman (25007) was killed.

=== Civil Aviation ===
On May 10, 1992, Quzhou Civil Aviation Station was established. On November 30, 1992, construction of Quzhou Civil Aviation Station began. On November 26, 1993, Quzhou Civil Aviation Station officially opened to traffic.

From March 2002 to March 2003, the airport suspended operations for an expansion project of its flight area. Pavement was reinforced by adding a 21cm thick overlay to the old pavement, the structural strength (PCN value) of the runway was improved, enhancing the pavement's load-bearing capacity and fatigue resistance. The airport's flight area standard remained at 4C. The runway was extended from its original 2,200 metres to the current 2,600 metres.

== Military use ==
Located 500 km from Taiwan just at the edge of effective cruise missile and airstrike range, Quzhou is one of the largest and most important air bases of the PLAAF. The airport is fitted with a hardened underground hangar to protect aircraft from adversaries.

The facility is home to the 29th Fighter Division, which flies the Sukhoi Su-30MKK, and the 85th Fighter Brigade, equipped with the Chengdu J-20 stealth fighter.

== Civilian use ==
The airport has a 1,900-meter (8,200 ft) runway (class 4C) and a 3,440-square-meter terminal building. The airport can accommodate Boeing 737 and other medium to large narrow-body passenger aircraft. The passenger terminal building is 3,440 square meters, which can support 200 passengers during peak hours.

=== Airlines and destinations ===
Airlines	Destinations
Air China	Beijing–Capital, Beijing–Daxing, Chengdu–Tianfu
China Express Airlines	Aksu, Chongqing, Dalian, Dongying, Guiyang, Haikou, Jining, Kunming, Lanzhou, Qingdao, Xi'an, Zhanjiang, Zhengzhou, Zhoushan, Zhuhai
China Southern Airlines	Guangzhou
Shandong Airlines	Haikou, Nanning, Qingdao
XiamenAir	Shenzhen

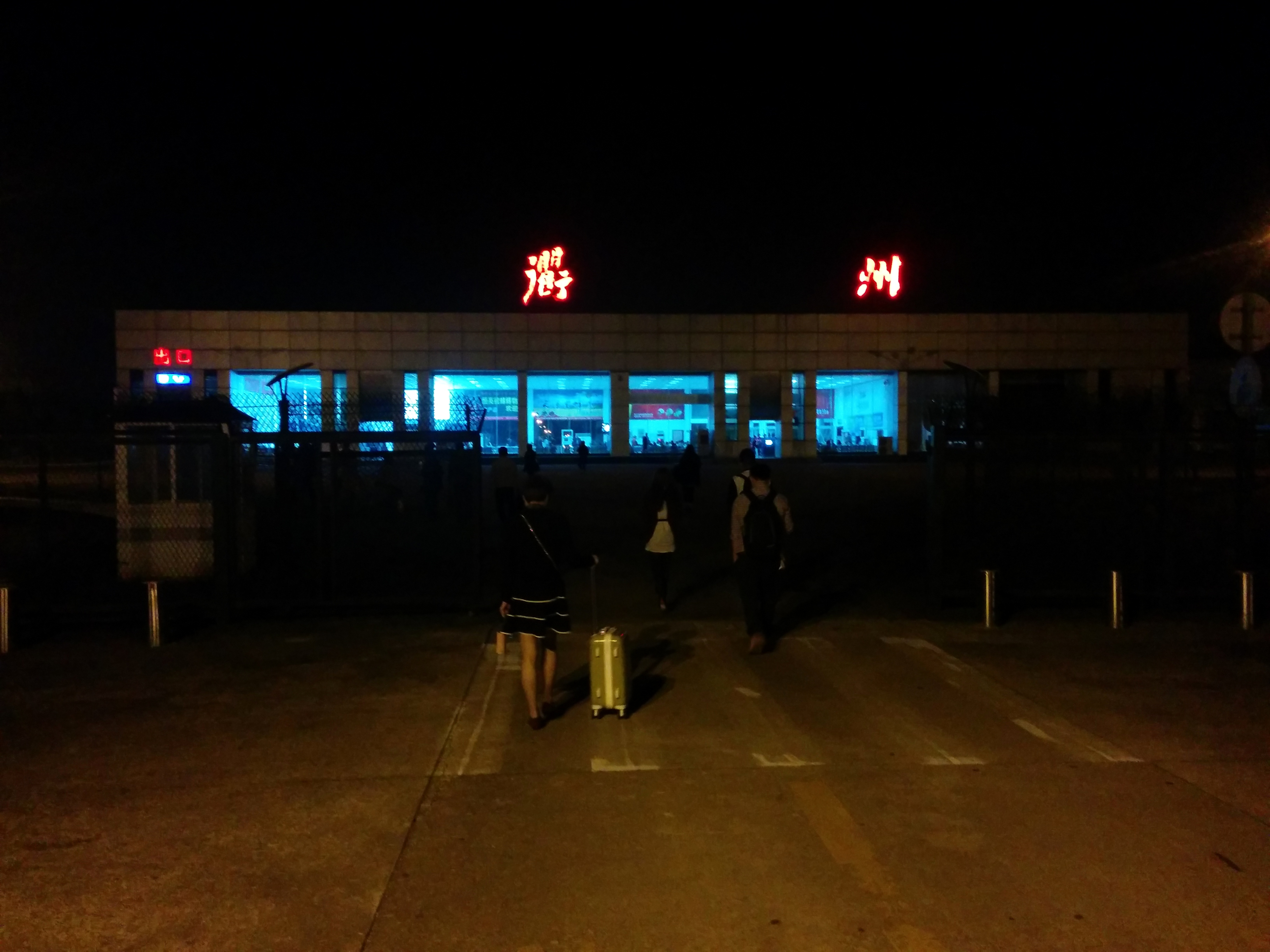
A lake separates the aircraft bays from the terminal building which is crossed by a long causeway

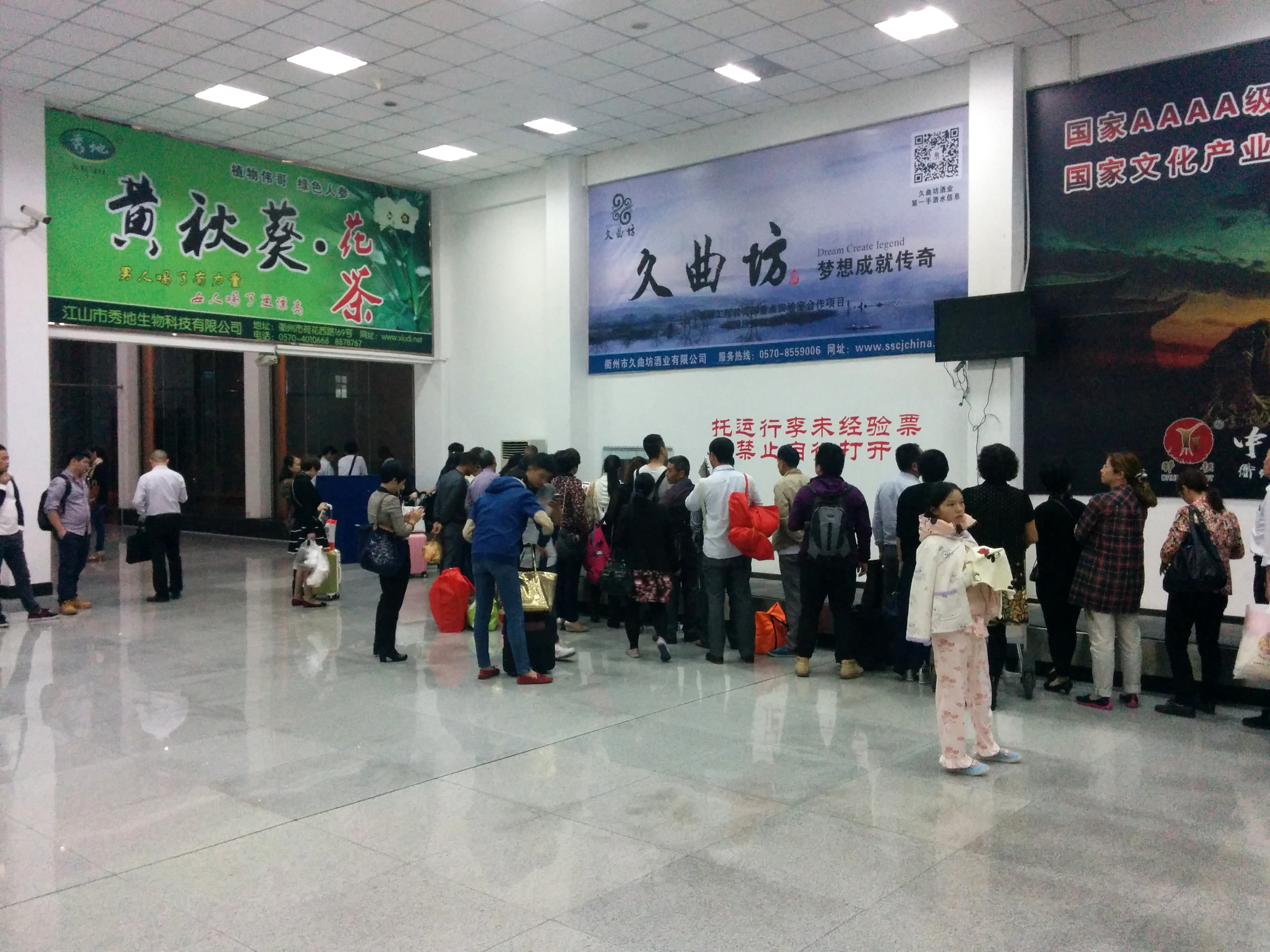
Single belt lining the western wall of Quzhou Airport

== See also ==
- List of airports in China
- List of the busiest airports in China
- List of People's Liberation Army Air Force airbases
