= Pinyin (disambiguation) =

Pinyin (Hànyǔ Pīnyīn) is the official romanization system for Standard Chinese in China, Singapore and, since 2009, Taiwan.

== Romanizations ==
Pinyin can also refer to other romanization systems used in China:

- For varieties of Chinese:
  - Tongyong Pinyin, a romanization of Mandarin Chinese formerly used in Taiwan
  - Wēituǒmǎ Pīnyīn, the Chinese name for the Wade–Giles system of Mandarin language romanization
  - Cantonese Pinyin, a standard romanization of Cantonese used in Hong Kong
  - Sichuanese Pinyin, a romanization of the Chengdu dialect of Sichuanese
  - Yēlǔ pīnyīn, romanization systems of Asian languages developed at Yale:
    - Yale romanization of Cantonese
    - Yale romanization of Mandarin
    - Yale romanization of Korean
- For other languages of China:
  - Tibetan pinyin, the official transcription system for Standard Tibetan in China
  - Uyghur pinyin, one of the official transcription systems for the Uyghur language in China

== Other uses ==
- Pinyin language, a Niger–Congo language spoken by some 27,000 people in the Northwest region of Cameroon
