= Pinhão =

Pinhão may refer to:

== Places ==
=== Brazil ===
- Pinhão, Sergipe, a municipality in the State of Sergipe
- Pinhão, Paraná, a municipality in the state of Paraná
- Pinhão River, river in southern Brazil

=== Portugal ===
- Pinhão (Alijó), a civil parish in the municipality of Alijó

== Other ==
- Pinhão (nut), a type of conifer nut

== See also ==
- Piñon
