= Zéo =

- Town and sub-prefecture
- Location in Ivory Coast
- Coordinates: 7°7′N 7°28′W
- Country: Ivory Coast
- District: Montagnes
- Region: Guémon
- Department: Bangolo

Population (2014)
  - Total: 9,259
- Time zone: UTC+0 (GMT)

Zéo is a town in western Ivory Coast. It is a sub-prefecture of Bangolo Department in Guémon Region, Montagnes District.

Zéo was a commune until March 2012, when it became one of 1,126 communes nationwide that were abolished.

In 2014, the population of the sub-prefecture of Zéo was 9,259.

== Villages ==
The nine villages of the sub-prefecture of Zéo and their population in 2014 are:

1. Béoua-Zibiao (586)
2. Diéou (952)
3. Douandrou 1 (656)
4. Douandrou 2 (402)
5. Goénié (1,064)
6. Kahi (821)
7. Kouisra (908)
8. Ponan (1,432)
9. Zéo (2,438)
