= Battle of Puerto de Piñones =

Part of the War of Mexican Independence

- Part of the Mexican War of Independence
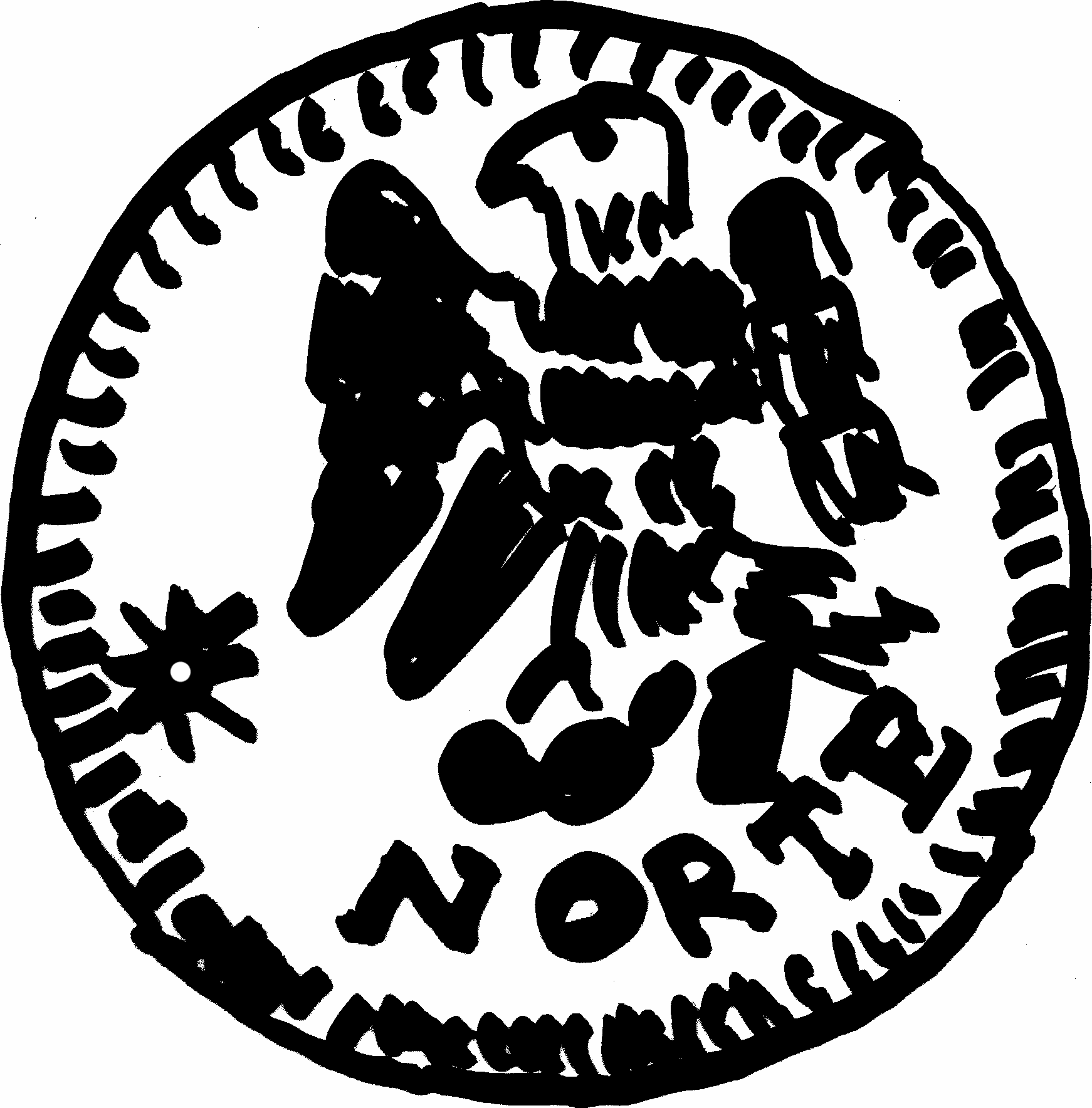
- Seal of Ignacio López Rayón and his army of the north during the Mexican War of Independence.
Date	1 April 1811
Location	Puerto de Piñones, Coahuila, Mexico
Result	Rebel victory

Belligerents
Mexican Rebels	Spanish Empire

Commanders and leaders
Ignacio López Rayón	José Manuel de Ochoa

The Battle of Puerto de Piñones took place during the War of Mexican Independence on 1 April 1811 at Puerto de Piñones, Coahuila. The battle was fought between the royalist forces loyal to the Spanish crown, commanded by José Manuel de Ochoa, and the Mexican rebels fighting for independence from the Spanish Empire, commanded by Ignacio López Rayón. The battle resulted in a victory for the Mexican rebels.

This battle was one of many battles that occurred between the armies of Ignacio López Rayón and José Manuel de Ochoa as López Rayón marched to take the industrial city of Zacatecas for the rebel cause. He had begun his march after hearing news of the capture of many of the rebel leaders at Acatita de Baján. Zacatecas was an important objective because it would provide much needed war supplies to rebel forces and thus, López Rayón was pursued by José Manuel de Ochoa in his march to the city. Lopez Rayon and his army defeated their royalist pursuers but not in such a decisive way that they ended their pursuit.

== Aftermath ==
On 15 April 1811, Lopez Rayon successfully reached Zacatecas and captured the city. Thereafter, the rebel forces had access to an industrial base with which they would use to make weapons and supplies.

== See also ==
- Mexican War of Independence
- José María Morelos

== Bibliography ==
- Bustamante, Carlos María de (1846). Cuadro histórico de la revolución mexicana, comenzada en 15 de septiembre de 1810 por el ciudadano Miguel Hidalgo y Costilla, Cura del pueblo de los Dolores (in Spanish). México DF: Impr. de JM Lara.
