= Guinglo-Tahouaké =

- Town and sub-prefecture
- Location in Ivory Coast
- Coordinates: 7°2′N 7°10′W
- Country: Ivory Coast
- District: Montagnes
- Region: Guémon
- Department: Bangolo

Population (2014)
  - Total: 36,368
- Time zone: UTC+0 (GMT)

Guinglo-Tahouaké is a town in western Ivory Coast. It is a sub-prefecture of Bangolo Department in Guémon Region, Montagnes District.

Guinglo-Tahouaké was a commune until March 2012, when it became one of 1,126 communes nationwide that were abolished.

In 2014, the population of the sub-prefecture of Guinglo-Tahouaké was 36,368.

== Villages ==
The four villages of the sub-prefecture of Guinglo-Tahouaké and their population in 2014 are:

1. Bangolo-Tahouaké (8,590)
2. Guézon-Tahouaké (8,824)
3. Guinglo-Tahouaké (18,067)
4. Zétrozon (887)
