= Guézon, Facobly =

Guézon
- Town and sub-prefecture
- Location in Ivory Coast
- Coordinates: 7°25′N 7°11′W
- Country: Ivory Coast
- District: Montagnes
- Region: Guémon
- Department: Facobly

Population (2014)
  - Total: 8,674
- Time zone: UTC+0 (GMT)

Guézon is a town in western Ivory Coast. It is a sub-prefecture of the Facobly Department in Guémon Region, Montagnes District.

Guézon was a commune until March 2012, when it was abolished with 1,126 other communes nationwide.

In 2014, the population of Guézon was 8,674.

== Villages ==
The five villages of Guézon and their populations in 2014 are:

1. Gbézio (1,015)
2. Guézon (2,304)
3. Kloplou (1,352)
4. Soaékpé-Douédy (2,757)
  1. Douédy (1,707)
  2. Soakpé (1,050)
5. Séambly (1,246)
