= Béoué-Zibiao =

- Town and sub-prefecture
- Location in Ivory Coast
- Coordinates: 7°7′N 7°23′W
- Country: Ivory Coast
- District: Montagnes
- Region: Guémon
- Department: Bangolo

Population (2014)
  - Total: 21,927
- Time zone: UTC+0 (GMT)

Béoué-Zibiao is a town in western Ivory Coast. It is a sub-prefecture of Bangolo Department in Guémon Region, Montagnes District.

Béoué-Zibiao was a commune until March 2012, when it became one of 1,126 communes nationwide that were abolished.

In 2014, the population of the sub-prefecture of Béoué-Zibiao was 21,927.

== Villages ==
The 16 villages of the sub-prefecture of Béoué-Zibiao and their population in 2014 are:

1. Blédi (541)
2. Boho 1 (421)
3. Boho 2 (529)
4. Béoué-Zibiao (2,418)
5. Diahondi (1,200)
6. Diapléan (1,739)
7. Diourouzon (1,171)
8. Gaoya (906)
9. Gloplou (6,494)
10. Gohouo-Zibiao (957)
11. Goya (840)
12. Guiri (887)
13. Guékpé (1,151)
14. Plohouin (190)
15. Zibo (1,173)
16. Ziondrou (1,310)
