= Da (Javanese) =

da
- ꦢ
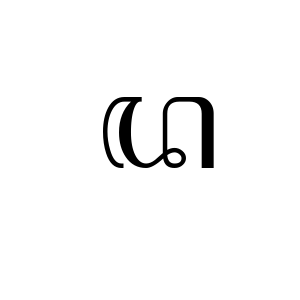
- Aksara nglegena

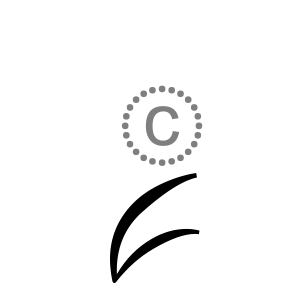
- Aksara pasangan

Usage
- Writing system: Javanese script
- Latin orthography: da
- Sound values: [d̪̥]
- In Unicode: A9A2

ꦢ is a syllable in the Javanese script that represents the sounds /d̪̥ɔ/, /d̪̥a/. It is transliterated to Latin as "da", and sometimes in Indonesian orthography as "do". It has another form (pasangan), which is ◌꧀ꦢ, but represented by a single Unicode code point, U+A9A2.

== Pasangan ==
Its pasangan form ◌꧀ꦢ, is located on the bottom side of the previous syllable. For example, ꦲꦤ꧀ꦢꦸꦏ꧀ - anduk (towel).

== Extended form ==
The letter ꦢ doesn't have a murda form.

Using cecak telu (ꦢ꦳), the syllable represents /dz/.

== Glyphs ==
Nglegena forms				Pasangan forms			
ꦢ da	ꦢꦃ dah	ꦢꦁ dang	ꦢꦂ dar	◌꧀ꦢ -da	◌꧀ꦢꦃ -dah	◌꧀ꦢꦁ -dang	◌꧀ꦢꦂ -dar
ꦢꦺ de	ꦢꦺꦃ deh	ꦢꦺꦁ deng	ꦢꦺꦂ der	◌꧀ꦢꦺ -de	◌꧀ꦢꦺꦃ -deh	◌꧀ꦢꦺꦁ -deng	◌꧀ꦢꦺꦂ -der
ꦢꦼ dê	ꦢꦼꦃ dêh	ꦢꦼꦁ dêng	ꦢꦼꦂ dêr	◌꧀ꦢꦼ -dê	◌꧀ꦢꦼꦃ -dêh	◌꧀ꦢꦼꦁ -dêng	◌꧀ꦢꦼꦂ -dêr
ꦢꦶ di	ꦢꦶꦃ dih	ꦢꦶꦁ ding	ꦢꦶꦂ dir	◌꧀ꦢꦶ -di	◌꧀ꦢꦶꦃ -dih	◌꧀ꦢꦶꦁ -ding	◌꧀ꦢꦶꦂ -dir
ꦢꦺꦴ do	ꦢꦺꦴꦃ doh	ꦢꦺꦴꦁ dong	ꦢꦺꦴꦂ dor	◌꧀ꦢꦺꦴ -do	◌꧀ꦢꦺꦴꦃ -doh	◌꧀ꦢꦺꦴꦁ -dong	◌꧀ꦢꦺꦴꦂ -dor
ꦢꦸ du	ꦢꦸꦃ duh	ꦢꦸꦁ dung	ꦢꦸꦂ dur	◌꧀ꦢꦸ -du	◌꧀ꦢꦸꦃ -duh	◌꧀ꦢꦸꦁ -dung	◌꧀ꦢꦸꦂ -dur
ꦢꦿ dra	ꦢꦿꦃ drah	ꦢꦿꦁ drang	ꦢꦿꦂ drar	◌꧀ꦢꦿ -dra	◌꧀ꦢꦿꦃ -drah	◌꧀ꦢꦿꦁ -drang	◌꧀ꦢꦿꦂ -drar
ꦢꦿꦺ dre	ꦢꦿꦺꦃ dreh	ꦢꦿꦺꦁ dreng	ꦢꦿꦺꦂ drer	◌꧀ꦢꦿꦺ -dre	◌꧀ꦢꦿꦺꦃ -dreh	◌꧀ꦢꦿꦺꦁ -dreng	◌꧀ꦢꦿꦺꦂ -drer
ꦢꦽ drê	ꦢꦽꦃ drêh	ꦢꦽꦁ drêng	ꦢꦽꦂ drêr	◌꧀ꦢꦽ -drê	◌꧀ꦢꦽꦃ -drêh	◌꧀ꦢꦽꦁ -drêng	◌꧀ꦢꦽꦂ -drêr
ꦢꦿꦶ dri	ꦢꦿꦶꦃ drih	ꦢꦿꦶꦁ dring	ꦢꦿꦶꦂ drir	◌꧀ꦢꦿꦶ -dri	◌꧀ꦢꦿꦶꦃ -drih	◌꧀ꦢꦿꦶꦁ -dring	◌꧀ꦢꦿꦶꦂ -drir
ꦢꦿꦺꦴ dro	ꦢꦿꦺꦴꦃ droh	ꦢꦿꦺꦴꦁ drong	ꦢꦿꦺꦴꦂ dror	◌꧀ꦢꦿꦺꦴ -dro	◌꧀ꦢꦿꦺꦴꦃ -droh	◌꧀ꦢꦿꦺꦴꦁ -drong	◌꧀ꦢꦿꦺꦴꦂ -dror
ꦢꦿꦸ dru	ꦢꦿꦸꦃ druh	ꦢꦿꦸꦁ drung	ꦢꦿꦸꦂ drur	◌꧀ꦢꦿꦸ -dru	◌꧀ꦢꦿꦸꦃ -druh	◌꧀ꦢꦿꦸꦁ -drung	◌꧀ꦢꦿꦸꦂ -drur
ꦢꦾ dya	ꦢꦾꦃ dyah	ꦢꦾꦁ dyang	ꦢꦾꦂ dyar	◌꧀ꦢꦾ -dya	◌꧀ꦢꦾꦃ -dyah	◌꧀ꦢꦾꦁ -dyang	◌꧀ꦢꦾꦂ -dyar
ꦢꦾꦺ dye	ꦢꦾꦺꦃ dyeh	ꦢꦾꦺꦁ dyeng	ꦢꦾꦺꦂ dyer	◌꧀ꦢꦾꦺ -dye	◌꧀ꦢꦾꦺꦃ -dyeh	◌꧀ꦢꦾꦺꦁ -dyeng	◌꧀ꦢꦾꦺꦂ -dyer
ꦢꦾꦼ dyê	ꦢꦾꦼꦃ dyêh	ꦢꦾꦼꦁ dyêng	ꦢꦾꦼꦂ dyêr	◌꧀ꦢꦾꦼ -dyê	◌꧀ꦢꦾꦼꦃ -dyêh	◌꧀ꦢꦾꦼꦁ -dyêng	◌꧀ꦢꦾꦼꦂ -dyêr
ꦢꦾꦶ dyi	ꦢꦾꦶꦃ dyih	ꦢꦾꦶꦁ dying	ꦢꦾꦶꦂ dyir	◌꧀ꦢꦾꦶ -dyi	◌꧀ꦢꦾꦶꦃ -dyih	◌꧀ꦢꦾꦶꦁ -dying	◌꧀ꦢꦾꦶꦂ -dyir
ꦢꦾꦺꦴ dyo	ꦢꦾꦺꦴꦃ dyoh	ꦢꦾꦺꦴꦁ dyong	ꦢꦾꦺꦴꦂ dyor	◌꧀ꦢꦾꦺꦴ -dyo	◌꧀ꦢꦾꦺꦴꦃ -dyoh	◌꧀ꦢꦾꦺꦴꦁ -dyong	◌꧀ꦢꦾꦺꦴꦂ -dyor
ꦢꦾꦸ dyu	ꦢꦾꦸꦃ dyuh	ꦢꦾꦸꦁ dyung	ꦢꦾꦸꦂ dyur	◌꧀ꦢꦾꦸ -dyu	◌꧀ꦢꦾꦸꦃ -dyuh	◌꧀ꦢꦾꦸꦁ -dyung	◌꧀ꦢꦾꦸꦂ -dyur

Other forms
Nglegena forms				Pasangan forms			
ꦢ꦳ dza	ꦢ꦳ꦃ dzah	ꦢ꦳ꦁ dzang	ꦢ꦳ꦂ dzar	◌꧀ꦢ꦳ -dza	◌꧀ꦢ꦳ꦃ -dzah	◌꧀ꦢ꦳ꦁ -dzang	◌꧀ꦢ꦳ꦂ -dzar
ꦢ꦳ꦺ dze	ꦢ꦳ꦺꦃ dzeh	ꦢ꦳ꦺꦁ dzeng	ꦢ꦳ꦺꦂ dzer	◌꧀ꦢ꦳ꦺ -dze	◌꧀ꦢ꦳ꦺꦃ -dzeh	◌꧀ꦢ꦳ꦺꦁ -dzeng	◌꧀ꦢ꦳ꦺꦂ -dzer
ꦢ꦳ꦼ dzê	ꦢ꦳ꦼꦃ dzêh	ꦢ꦳ꦼꦁ dzêng	ꦢ꦳ꦼꦂ dzêr	◌꧀ꦢ꦳ꦼ -dzê	◌꧀ꦢ꦳ꦼꦃ -dzêh	◌꧀ꦢ꦳ꦼꦁ -dzêng	◌꧀ꦢ꦳ꦼꦂ -dzêr
ꦢ꦳ꦶ dzi	ꦢ꦳ꦶꦃ dzih	ꦢ꦳ꦶꦁ dzing	ꦢ꦳ꦶꦂ dzir	◌꧀ꦢ꦳ꦶ -dzi	◌꧀ꦢ꦳ꦶꦃ -dzih	◌꧀ꦢ꦳ꦶꦁ -dzing	◌꧀ꦢ꦳ꦶꦂ -dzir
ꦢ꦳ꦺꦴ dzo	ꦢ꦳ꦺꦴꦃ dzoh	ꦢ꦳ꦺꦴꦁ dzong	ꦢ꦳ꦺꦴꦂ dzor	◌꧀ꦢ꦳ꦺꦴ -dzo	◌꧀ꦢ꦳ꦺꦴꦃ -dzoh	◌꧀ꦢ꦳ꦺꦴꦁ -dzong	◌꧀ꦢ꦳ꦺꦴꦂ -dzor
ꦢ꦳ꦸ dzu	ꦢ꦳ꦸꦃ dzuh	ꦢ꦳ꦸꦁ dzung	ꦢ꦳ꦸꦂ dzur	◌꧀ꦢ꦳ꦸ -dzu	◌꧀ꦢ꦳ꦸꦃ -dzuh	◌꧀ꦢ꦳ꦸꦁ -dzung	◌꧀ꦢ꦳ꦸꦂ -dzur
ꦢ꦳ꦿ dzra	ꦢ꦳ꦿꦃ dzrah	ꦢ꦳ꦿꦁ dzrang	ꦢ꦳ꦿꦂ dzrar	◌꧀ꦢ꦳ꦿ -dzra	◌꧀ꦢ꦳ꦿꦃ -dzrah	◌꧀ꦢ꦳ꦿꦁ -dzrang	◌꧀ꦢ꦳ꦿꦂ -dzrar
ꦢ꦳ꦿꦺ dzre	ꦢ꦳ꦿꦺꦃ dzreh	ꦢ꦳ꦿꦺꦁ dzreng	ꦢ꦳ꦿꦺꦂ dzrer	◌꧀ꦢ꦳ꦿꦺ -dzre	◌꧀ꦢ꦳ꦿꦺꦃ -dzreh	◌꧀ꦢ꦳ꦿꦺꦁ -dzreng	◌꧀ꦢ꦳ꦿꦺꦂ -dzrer
ꦢ꦳ꦽ dzrê	ꦢ꦳ꦽꦃ dzrêh	ꦢ꦳ꦽꦁ dzrêng	ꦢ꦳ꦽꦂ dzrêr	◌꧀ꦢ꦳ꦽ -dzrê	◌꧀ꦢ꦳ꦽꦃ -dzrêh	◌꧀ꦢ꦳ꦽꦁ -dzrêng	◌꧀ꦢ꦳ꦽꦂ -dzrêr
ꦢ꦳ꦿꦶ dzri	ꦢ꦳ꦿꦶꦃ dzrih	ꦢ꦳ꦿꦶꦁ dzring	ꦢ꦳ꦿꦶꦂ dzrir	◌꧀ꦢ꦳ꦿꦶ -dzri	◌꧀ꦢ꦳ꦿꦶꦃ -dzrih	◌꧀ꦢ꦳ꦿꦶꦁ -dzring	◌꧀ꦢ꦳ꦿꦶꦂ -dzrir
ꦢ꦳ꦿꦺꦴ dzro	ꦢ꦳ꦿꦺꦴꦃ dzroh	ꦢ꦳ꦿꦺꦴꦁ dzrong	ꦢ꦳ꦿꦺꦴꦂ dzror	◌꧀ꦢ꦳ꦿꦺꦴ -dzro	◌꧀ꦢ꦳ꦿꦺꦴꦃ -dzroh	◌꧀ꦢ꦳ꦿꦺꦴꦁ -dzrong	◌꧀ꦢ꦳ꦿꦺꦴꦂ -dzror
ꦢ꦳ꦿꦸ dzru	ꦢ꦳ꦿꦸꦃ dzruh	ꦢ꦳ꦿꦸꦁ dzrung	ꦢ꦳ꦿꦸꦂ dzrur	◌꧀ꦢ꦳ꦿꦸ -dzru	◌꧀ꦢ꦳ꦿꦸꦃ -dzruh	◌꧀ꦢ꦳ꦿꦸꦁ -dzrung	◌꧀ꦢ꦳ꦿꦸꦂ -dzrur
ꦢ꦳ꦾ dzya	ꦢ꦳ꦾꦃ dzyah	ꦢ꦳ꦾꦁ dzyang	ꦢ꦳ꦾꦂ dzyar	◌꧀ꦢ꦳ꦾ -dzya	◌꧀ꦢ꦳ꦾꦃ -dzyah	◌꧀ꦢ꦳ꦾꦁ -dzyang	◌꧀ꦢ꦳ꦾꦂ -dzyar
ꦢ꦳ꦾꦺ dzye	ꦢ꦳ꦾꦺꦃ dzyeh	ꦢ꦳ꦾꦺꦁ dzyeng	ꦢ꦳ꦾꦺꦂ dzyer	◌꧀ꦢ꦳ꦾꦺ -dzye	◌꧀ꦢ꦳ꦾꦺꦃ -dzyeh	◌꧀ꦢ꦳ꦾꦺꦁ -dzyeng	◌꧀ꦢ꦳ꦾꦺꦂ -dzyer
ꦢ꦳ꦾꦼ dzyê	ꦢ꦳ꦾꦼꦃ dzyêh	ꦢ꦳ꦾꦼꦁ dzyêng	ꦢ꦳ꦾꦼꦂ dzyêr	◌꧀ꦢ꦳ꦾꦼ -dzyê	◌꧀ꦢ꦳ꦾꦼꦃ -dzyêh	◌꧀ꦢ꦳ꦾꦼꦁ -dzyêng	◌꧀ꦢ꦳ꦾꦼꦂ -dzyêr
ꦢ꦳ꦾꦶ dzyi	ꦢ꦳ꦾꦶꦃ dzyih	ꦢ꦳ꦾꦶꦁ dzying	ꦢ꦳ꦾꦶꦂ dzyir	◌꧀ꦢ꦳ꦾꦶ -dzyi	◌꧀ꦢ꦳ꦾꦶꦃ -dzyih	◌꧀ꦢ꦳ꦾꦶꦁ -dzying	◌꧀ꦢ꦳ꦾꦶꦂ -dzyir
ꦢ꦳ꦾꦺꦴ dzyo	ꦢ꦳ꦾꦺꦴꦃ dzyoh	ꦢ꦳ꦾꦺꦴꦁ dzyong	ꦢ꦳ꦾꦺꦴꦂ dzyor	◌꧀ꦢ꦳ꦾꦺꦴ -dzyo	◌꧀ꦢ꦳ꦾꦺꦴꦃ -dzyoh	◌꧀ꦢ꦳ꦾꦺꦴꦁ -dzyong	◌꧀ꦢ꦳ꦾꦺꦴꦂ -dzyor
ꦢ꦳ꦾꦸ dzyu	ꦢ꦳ꦾꦸꦃ dzyuh	ꦢ꦳ꦾꦸꦁ dzyung	ꦢ꦳ꦾꦸꦂ dzyur	◌꧀ꦢ꦳ꦾꦸ -dzyu	◌꧀ꦢ꦳ꦾꦸꦃ -dzyuh	◌꧀ꦢ꦳ꦾꦸꦁ -dzyung	◌꧀ꦢ꦳ꦾꦸꦂ -dzyur

== Unicode block ==
Javanese script was added to the Unicode Standard in October, 2009 with the release of version 5.2.

Javanese^{[1]}^{[2]} Official Unicode Consortium code chart (PDF)
	0	1	2	3	4	5	6	7	8	9	A	B	C	D	E	F
U+A98x	ꦀ	ꦁ	ꦂ	ꦃ	ꦄ	ꦅ	ꦆ	ꦇ	ꦈ	ꦉ	ꦊ	ꦋ	ꦌ	ꦍ	ꦎ	ꦏ
U+A99x	ꦐ	ꦑ	ꦒ	ꦓ	ꦔ	ꦕ	ꦖ	ꦗ	ꦘ	ꦙ	ꦚ	ꦛ	ꦜ	ꦝ	ꦞ	ꦟ
U+A9Ax	ꦠ	ꦡ	ꦢ	ꦣ	ꦤ	ꦥ	ꦦ	ꦧ	ꦨ	ꦩ	ꦪ	ꦫ	ꦬ	ꦭ	ꦮ	ꦯ
U+A9Bx	ꦰ	ꦱ	ꦲ	꦳	ꦴ	ꦵ	ꦶ	ꦷ	ꦸ	ꦹ	ꦺ	ꦻ	ꦼ	ꦽ	ꦾ	ꦿ
U+A9Cx	꧀	꧁	꧂	꧃	꧄	꧅	꧆	꧇	꧈	꧉	꧊	꧋	꧌	꧍		ꧏ
U+A9Dx	꧐	꧑	꧒	꧓	꧔	꧕	꧖	꧗	꧘	꧙					꧞	꧟
Notes 1.As of Unicode version 17.0 2.Grey areas indicate non-assigned code points
