= Dah =

Dah or DAH may refer to:

- Morse code symbol
- Dah, Ivory Coast, a village in Montagnes District
- Dah, Ladakh, a village in Jammu and Kashmir, India
- Dah, Mali, a town in Ségou Region
- Dah (band), former Yugoslav/Belgian band
- Air Algérie (ICAO code: DAH), Algerian airline
- Gwahatike language, a PNG Finisterre language, ISO 639 code dah
- Dominica Award of Honour, an award of the Commonwealth of Dominica - postnominal letters are 'D.A.H.'
- Republic of Dahomey, former UNDP country code

== See also ==
- Daha (disambiguation)
