= Kahin-Zarabaon =

- Town and sub-prefecture
- Location in Ivory Coast
- Coordinates: 6°55′N 7°39′W
- Country: Ivory Coast
- District: Montagnes
- Region: Guémon
- Department: Bangolo

Area
  - Total: 294 km^{2} (114 sq mi)

Population (2021 census)
  - Total: 59,759
  - Density: 203/km^{2} (526/sq mi)
  - Town: 25,450
- (2014 census)
- Time zone: UTC+0 (GMT)

Kahin-Zarabaon is a town in western Ivory Coast. It is a sub-prefecture of Bangolo Department in Guémon Region, Montagnes District.

Kahin-Zarabaon was a commune until March 2012, when it became one of 1,126 communes nationwide that were abolished.

In 2021, the population of the sub-prefecture of Kahin-Zarabaon was 59,759.

== Villages ==
The seven villages of the sub-prefecture of Kahin-Zarabaon and their population in 2014 are:

1. Banguiéhi (7,348)
2. Gloubly (4,464)
3. Kahin-Zarabaon (25,450)
4. Koulouan (6,006)
5. Péhê-Zarabaon (3,513)
6. Pinhou (9,372)
7. Tié-Iné Zarabaon (6,302)
