= Gardiehbey Zeo =

Liberian footballer

Personal information
- Full name: Gardiehbey Bob Zeo
- Date of birth: February 3, 1986 (age 40)
- Place of birth: Monrovia, Liberia
- Height: 1.75 m (5 ft 9 in)
- Position: Striker

Senior career*
Years	Team	Apps	(Gls)
2002	Invincible Eleven		
2003	Sekondi Eleven Wise		
2004–2007	Heart of Lions		
2007	GD Maputo		

International career
2003–2005	Liberia	3	(0)
- * Club domestic league appearances and goals

Gardiehbey Zeo (born February 3, 1986, in Monrovia) is a Liberian footballer (striker) playing formerly for Heart of Lions. He is also a member of the Liberia national football team.
