= Espinho =

Espinho may refer to:

== People ==
- Fábio Espinho (born 1985), Portuguese footballer

== Places ==
- Espinho, Portugal, a city and municipality of Portugal
- Espinho (Braga), a civil parish in the municipality of Braga, Portugal
- Espinho (Mangualde), a civil parish in the municipality of Mangualde, Portugal
- Espinho (Mortágua), a civil parish in the municipality of Mortágua, Portugal
- Espinho Branco, village in island Santiago, Cape Verde

== Other uses ==
- S.C. Espinho, a Portuguese sports club from the city of Espinho in the Aveiro district
- Espinho Airport, an airport serving Espinho in northern Portugal
