= Bangolo =

- Town, sub-prefecture, and commune
- Location in Ivory Coast
- Coordinates: 7°1′N 7°29′W
- Country: Ivory Coast
- District: Montagnes
- Region: Guémon
- Department: Bangolo

Area
  - Total: 355 km^{2} (137 sq mi)

Population (2021 census)
  - Total: 56,415
  - Density: 159/km^{2} (412/sq mi)
  - Town: 16,864
- (2014 census)
- Time zone: UTC+0 (GMT)

Bangolo is a town in western Ivory Coast. It is a sub-prefecture of and the seat of Bangolo Department in Guémon Region, Montagnes District. Bangolo is also a commune.

In 2021, the population of the sub-prefecture of Bangolo was 56,415.

== Villages ==
The 21 villages of the sub-prefecture of Bangolo and their population in 2014 are:

1. Bangolo (16 864)
2. Bangolo-Kahen (689)
3. Bangolo-Zonfaély (1 039)
4. Béon-Gohouo (1 495)
5. Béoué-Zagna (1 844)
6. Binao (280)
7. Dah (3 005)
8. Ganzon (475)
9. Grand Pin (2 103)
10. Guéhouo (2 400)
11. Guézon-Zagna (593)
12. Guinglo-Zagna (726)
13. Kahen-Zagna (1 138)
14. Péhai-Zagna (608)
15. Petit Pin (529)
16. Séba (1 516)
17. Tahoubly-Gaé (326)
18. Tiembly-Gloplou (670)
19. Yabligué (1 019)
20. Yabli-Guinglo (847)
21. Zibabo-Yéblo (376)
