= Dazhou Island =

Island in Hainan, China

Dazhou Island, Tinhosa Island
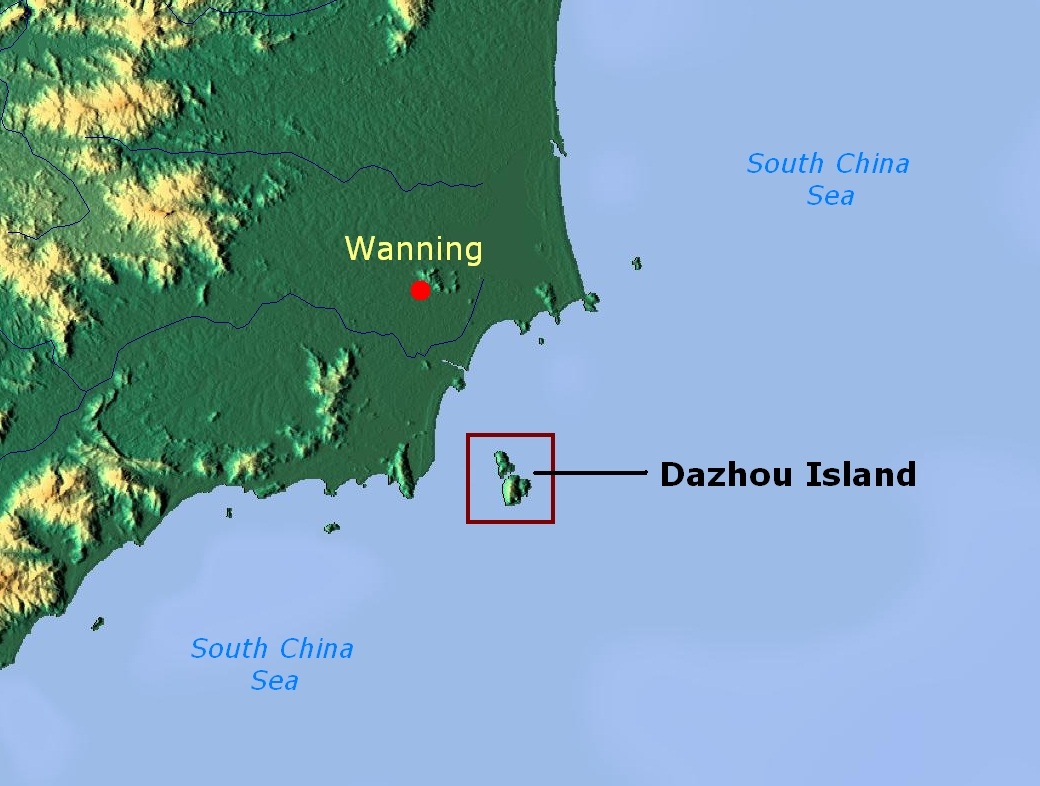
- Interactive map of Dazhou Island, Tinhosa Island

Geography
- Coordinates: 18.675357°N 110.480881°E
- Archipelago: archipelago
- Total islands: 2
- Highest elevation: 289 m (948 ft)

Administration
- China
- Province: Hainan

Demographics
- Population: 0 (2026)
- Pop. density: 0/km^{2} (0/sq mi)no population
- Ethnic groups: N\A

Dazhou Island (commonly known as Grand Island or Tinhosa Island) is a state-level nature reserve located about 5 km off the coast of Wanning, Hainan, China. This protected area covers 4.36 square kilometres, and comprises three mountains spanning two islands. These mountains, the tallest of which is 289 metres above sea level, have been used as navigational markers by mariners since the Tang dynasty.

Dazhou Island
- Simplified Chinese: 大洲岛
- Traditional Chinese: 大洲島
Transcriptions
Standard Mandarin
- Hanyu Pinyin: dàzhōudǎo

== Geography ==
The islands are composed of mainly rain forests and rocky terrain.

== Wildlife ==
This group of two islands is home to more than one hundred individual flocks of swifts. These swifts, the only colonies in China, nest in caves. The nests are gathered for bird's nest soup.
