= Bangolo Department =

Coordinates: 7°1′N 7°29′W

Bangolo Department Département de Bangolo
- Department
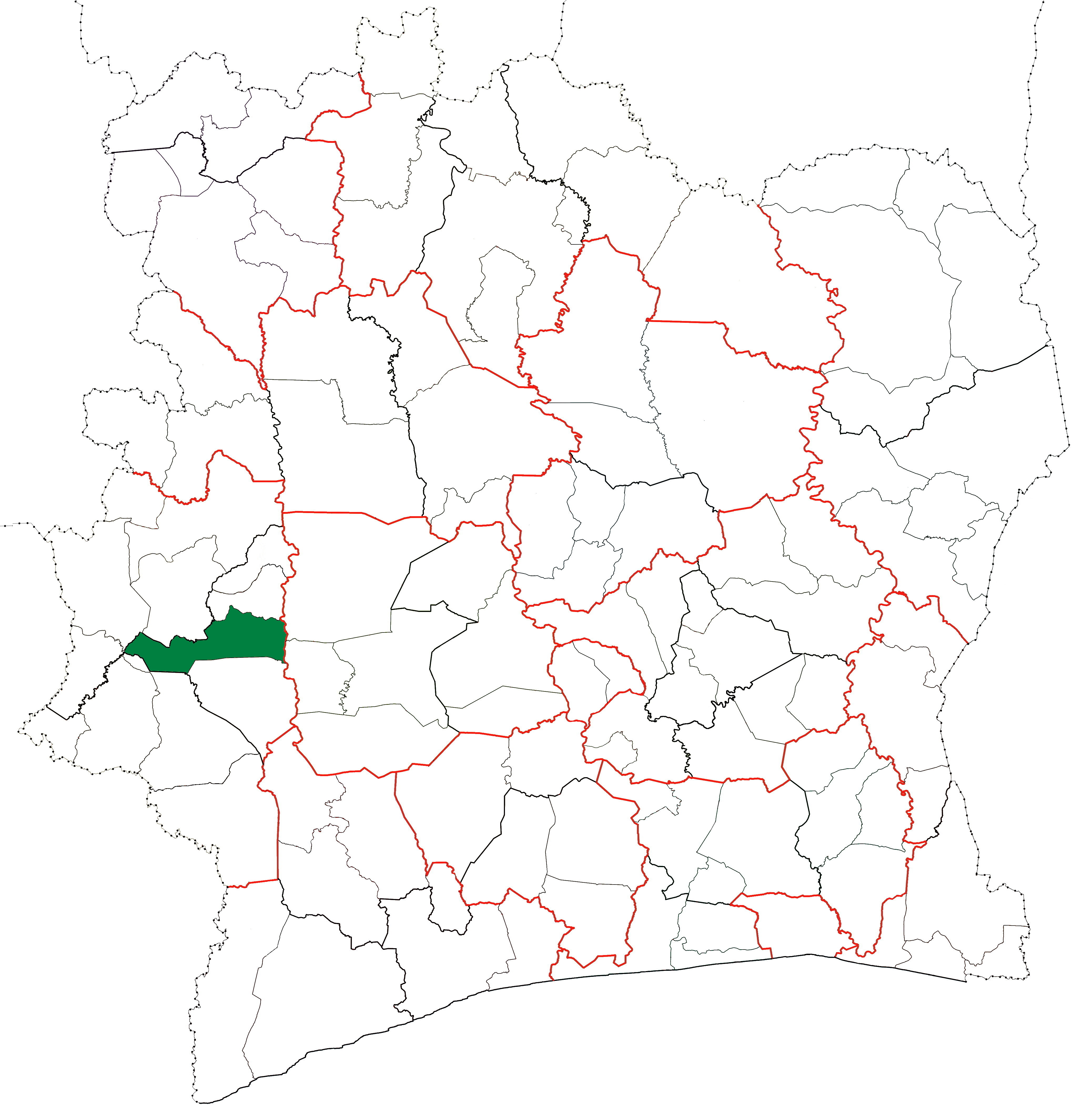
- Location in Ivory Coast. Bangolo Department has retained the same boundaries since its creation in 1988.
- Country: Ivory Coast
- District: Montagnes
- Region: Guémon
- 1988: Established as a first-level subdivision via a division of Man Dept
- 1997: Converted to a second-level subdivision
- 2011: Converted to a third-level subdivision
- Departmental seat: Bangolo

Government
  - Prefect: Mahama Gbané

Area
  - Total: 2,210 km^{2} (850 sq mi)

Population (2021 census)
  - Total: 270,629
  - Density: 122/km^{2} (317/sq mi)
- Time zone: UTC+0 (GMT)

Bangolo Department is a department of Guémon Region in Montagnes District, Ivory Coast. In 2021, its population was 270,629 and its seat is the settlement of Bangolo. The sub-prefectures of the department are Bangolo, Béoué-Zibiao, Bléniméouin, Diéouzon, Gohouo-Zagna, Guinglo-Tahouaké, Kahin-Zarabaon, Zéo, and Zou.

== History ==
Bangolo Department was created in 1988 as a first-level subdivision via a split-off from Man Department.

In 1997, regions were introduced as new first-level subdivisions of Ivory Coast; as a result, all departments were converted into second-level subdivisions. Bangolo Department was included in Dix-Huit Montagnes Region.

In 2011, districts were introduced as new first-level subdivisions of Ivory Coast. At the same time, regions were reorganised and became second-level subdivisions and all departments were converted into third-level subdivisions. At this time, Bangolo Department became part of Guémon Region in Montagnes District.
